= Ewan Christian =

British architect (1814–1895)

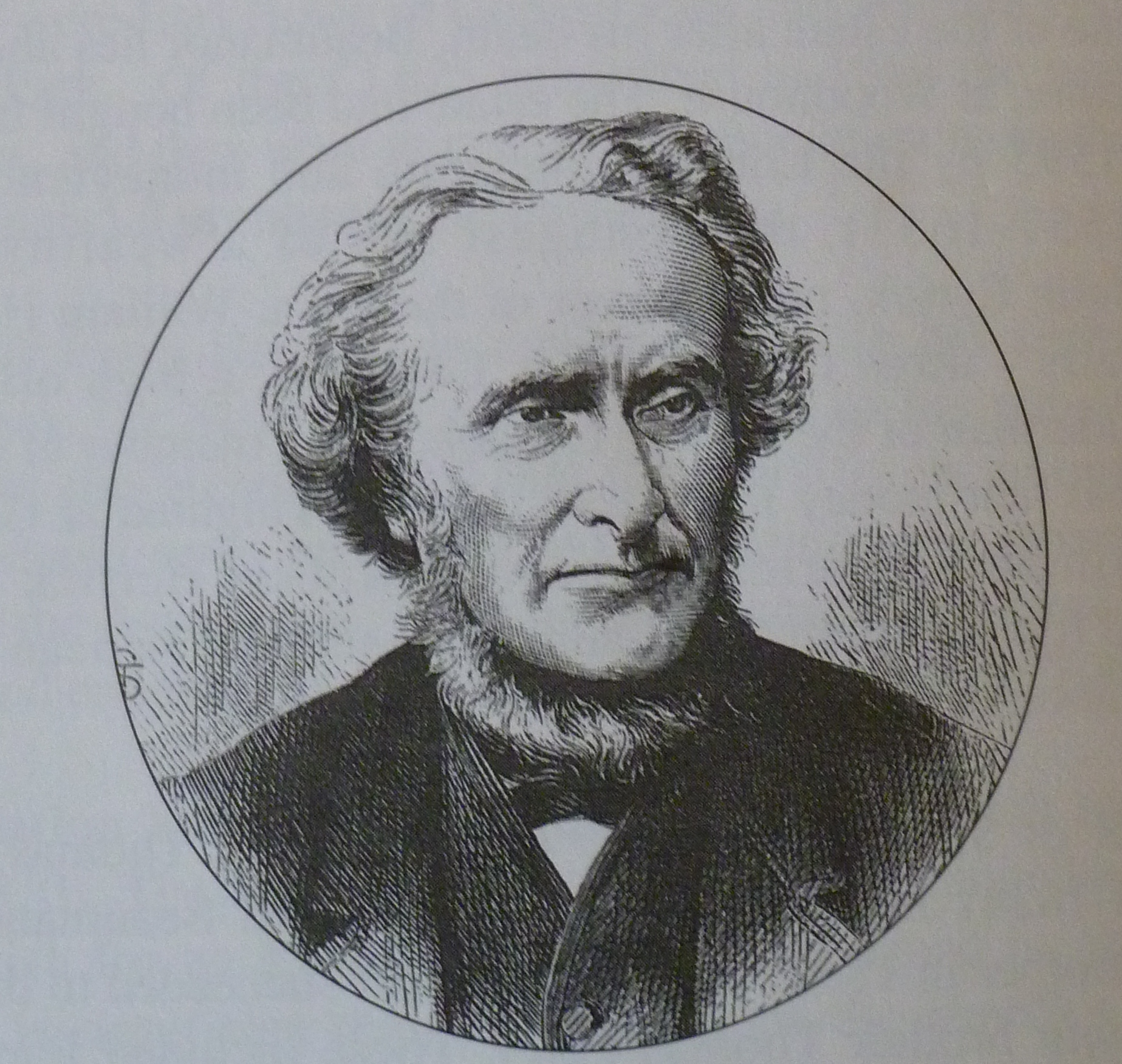
- Ewan Christian, portrait in The Builder 21 May 1870
- Born: 20 September 1814; Marylebone, London, England
- Died: 21 February 1895 (aged 80); Hampstead, London, England
- Occupation: Architect
- Awards: Royal Gold Medal (1887)
- Buildings: National Portrait Gallery
- Projects: Carlisle Cathedral restoration, Southwell Minster restoration

Ewan Christian (1814–1895) was a British architect. He is most frequently noted for the restorations of Southwell Minster and Carlisle Cathedral, and the design of the National Portrait Gallery. He was Architect to the Ecclesiastical Commissioners from 1851 to 1895. Christian was elected A RIBA in 1840, FRIBA in 1850, RIBA President 1884–1886 and was awarded the Royal Gold Medal in 1887.

He is an uncle of English-American architect Gordon W. Lloyd.

== Life ==
=== National Portrait Gallery ===
Ewan Christian is well-known for designing the National Portrait Gallery (1890–1895) in St Martin's Place, London, just north of Trafalgar Square. The building's facade, faced in Portland stone, is not typical of his work and was built towards the end of his life, completed shortly after his death. Christian was an unexpected and controversial choice for such a commission and was appointed by the donor for the new building, W. H. Alexander (1832–1905). In the autumn of 1889 the architect embarked on a study tour of continental museums and art galleries to prepare himself for the task, an exhausting project which included visits to Bruges, Ghent, Antwerp, Amsterdam, Berlin, Frankfurt, Kassel and Dresden.

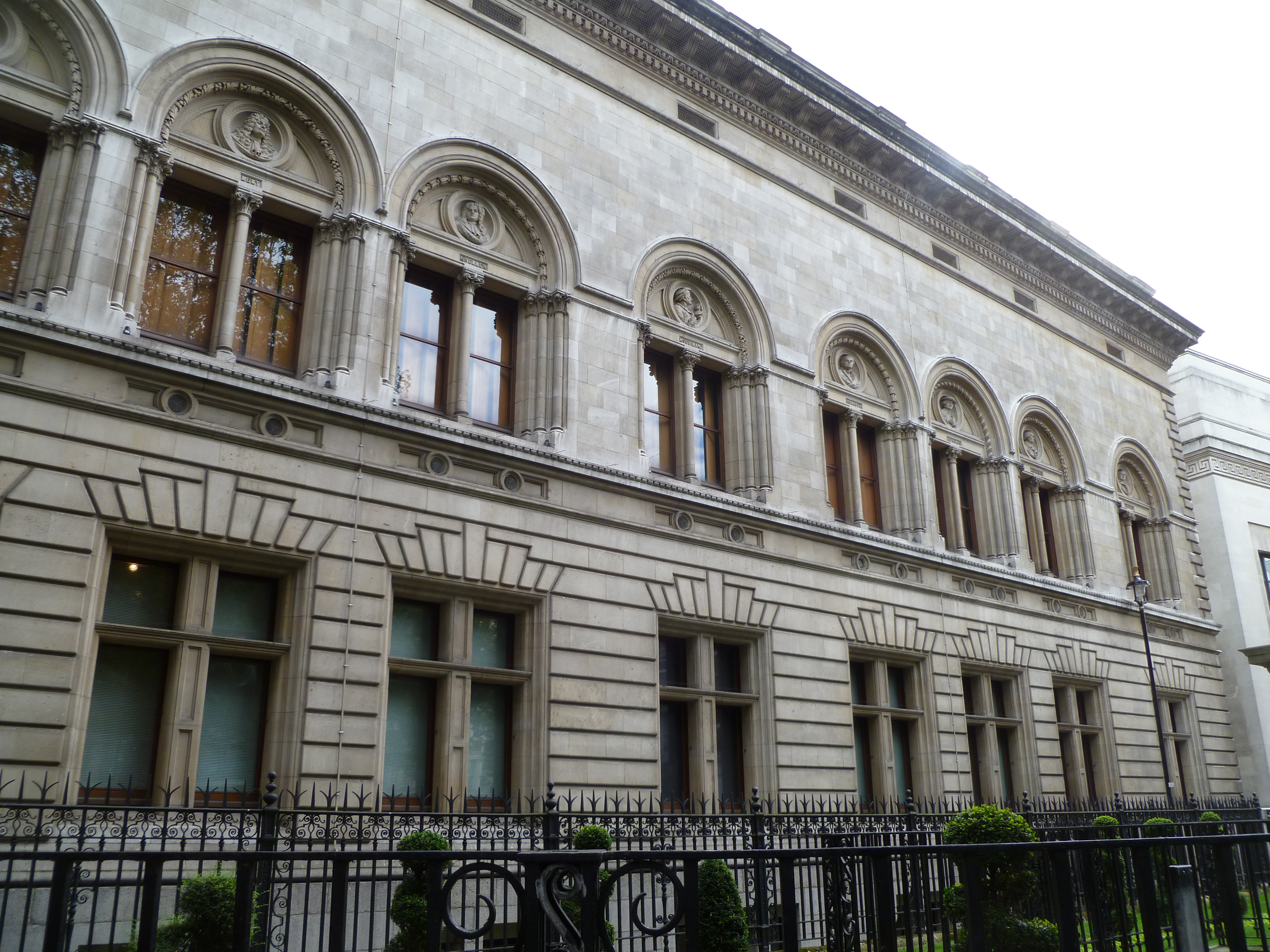
The National Portrait Gallery, London, (1890–1895): the main north front facing Charing Cross Road

Christian was obliged to match the Greek Classical style of the National Gallery (built in 1838 by William Wilkins 1778–1839), which was set immediately to the south of the NPG site and adjoined it on its east side, but he provided a strikingly original design for his main north block towards Charing Cross Road based on the style of a Florentine Renaissance palazzo. The first floor for this block has large round-arched windows which bear portrait busts in roundels of famous painters, sculptors, antiquarians and historians, including Hans Holbein, Sir Peter Lely, Sir Anthony van Dyck, Sir Godfrey Kneller, Sir Joshua Reynolds, Sir Thomas Lawrence, William Hogarth, Louis Francois Roubiliac, Sir Francis Chantrey and Horace Walpole. The impressive pedimented entrance block is richly treated with more portrait busts in roundels, which include that for the 5th Earl Stanhope (1805–1875) whose campaign in parliament had led to the NPG's foundation in 1856 (the Gallery first opened in a Georgian house in Great George Street, Westminster, in 1859). He is flanked by busts of Thomas Carlyle (1795–1881) and Thomas Babington Macaulay (1800–1859), historians who gave support to the idea of a National Portrait Gallery. The entrance frontage is modelled on the facade of the late 15th-century oratory of Santo Spirito in Bologna which Christian probably saw on one of his earlier Italian study tours. Above the doors are the Royal Arms sculpted by Frederick C. Thomas (fl.1892–1901) who was also responsible for the busts.

=== Early life ===
Christian was born in Marylebone, London, on 20 September 1814, the seventh of nine children. His father, Joseph Christian (d. 1821), came from an old Isle of Man family of landed gentry whose own grandfather was Thomas Christian (d.1770), Rector of Crosthwaite in Cumberland. Many senior members of the family had held the post of Deemster (justice) on Man for centuries past. They lived at Milntown on the island and had estates in Cumberland, particularly at Ewanrigg Hall (demolished 1903) near Maryport. Ewan is a popular given name in the family. The famous mutineer of HMS Bounty, Fletcher Christian (1764–c.1793), was also of the family, descended from a senior line to the architect's. Ewan Christian's mother was Katherine Scales (d.1822) of Thwaitehead in Lancashire. Both of the architect's parents died when he was around seven years old and he was thereafter brought up by his grandparents at Mortlake and then, after his grandfather died, by his eldest brother, John, who lived in Wigmore Street in Marylebone. He was educated at Christ's Hospital School from the age of nine, first at the junior school in Hertford then at the main school in Newgate Street, London (this moved to Horsham in 1902 and Christian, who became a governor of the school, acted as assessor in an architectural competition for the new buildings in 1893). On his 15th birthday Christian was articled to the London architect Matthew Habershon (1789–1852) and also enrolled at the Royal Academy Schools.

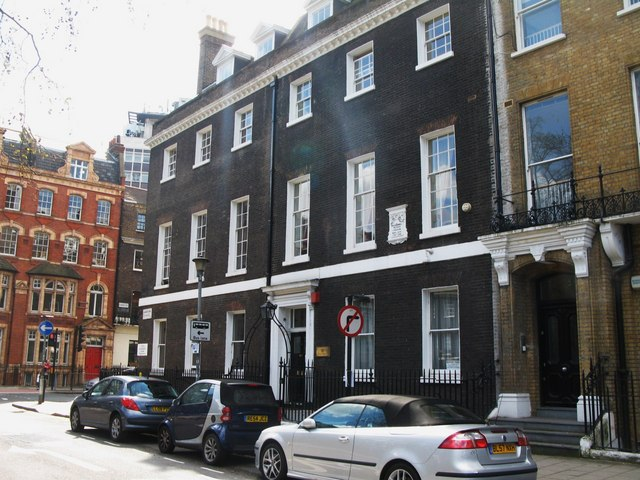
Christian set up his architectural practice in Bloomsbury Square in 1842, and moved across to this corner of the square in 1847

In 1836 Christian briefly joined as assistant the office of William Railton (c.1801–1877), later architect of Nelson's Column in Trafalgar Square, London, who was appointed as Architect to the Ecclesiastical Commissioners in 1838 – a post which Christian later succeeded to. The Ecclesiastical Commissioners were set up as a permanent body by the government in 1836 to administer the estates and revenues of the Church of England. Following a study tour of Italy in 1837 Christian went into the office of John Brown (1805–1876) in Norwich and supervised the construction of Brown's St Margaret's Church at Lee in Lewisham and his Colchester Union Workhouse (here Christian's close scrutiny of the work so irritated the labourers that they deliberately caused a drain to burst in order to discredit him). In 1841 he designed his first independent building, the Marylebone Savings Bank, perhaps commissioned through local and family connections. Between 1841 and 1842 Christian embarked on a long continental study tour in company with other young architects who were to remain lifelong friends and following this he established his own architectural practice in October 1842 at 44 Bloomsbury Square, London, where he also lived (he later moved across to the former home of Isaac D'Israeli, father of the famous prime minister, on a corner of the square). On his marriage in 1848 to Annie Bentham (1814–1913), a relation of the Utilitarian philosopher Jeremy Bentham, Christian set up home in Hampstead in the north London suburbs while continuing his business in Bloomsbury. The couple were to have four daughters – Eleanor, Anne Elizabeth, Agnes and Alice. Anne Elizabeth, known as 'Bessie', was Christian's favourite daughter who died in 1890 after giving birth to Christian's only grandchild, Ewan Christopher Blaxland (1889–1954), who became a clergyman as his grandfather was originally intended to be.

=== Career ===
==== Influences ====
Christian became one of the most respected and successful men in his profession and was highly regarded by many leading architects of the Victorian era. Many became personal friends, particularly Samuel Sanders Teulon (1812–1873) who also lived in Hampstead and designed his masterpiece St Stephen's Church there, and Horace Jones (1819–1887), later architect to the Corporation of the City of London (both were companions on the Continental tour of 1841–42) who designed Smithfield Meat Market, Billingsgate Fish Market and Leadenhall Market for the city. George Edmund Street (1824–1881), designer of the Royal Courts of Justice in the Strand in London, was an influence on his church work as was John Loughborough Pearson (1817–1897), the architect of Truro Cathedral and St Augustine's, Kilburn, who was a close friend and married Christian's Isle of Man cousin Jemima in 1862 (Jemima's brother Joseph Henry Christian (1832–1906) became a partner in Christian's practice in 1874 together with a former pupil Charles Henry Purday (d.1900), though work continued to be carried out in Ewan Christian's name only). W. D. Caroe (1857–1938) had been a managing assistant in Christian's office and took over as Architect to the Ecclesiastical Commissioners on Christian's death, for example at St David's Church, Exeter.

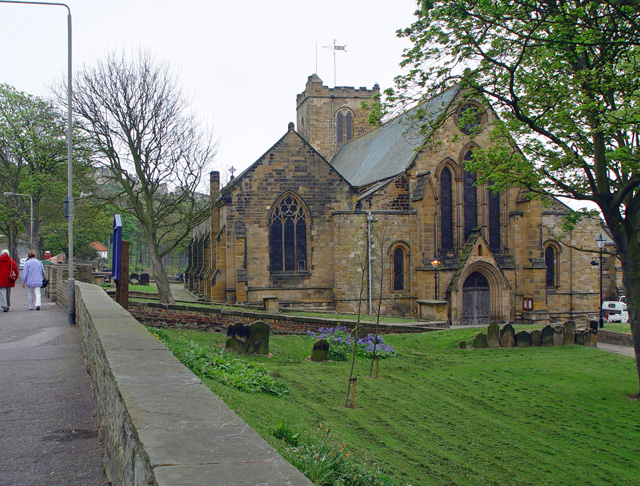
St Mary's Church, Scarborough, one of Christian's first church restorations in 1848–1852. He rebuilt the outer north aisle (on the left of the picture) and restored the west front (shown) to its present appearance.

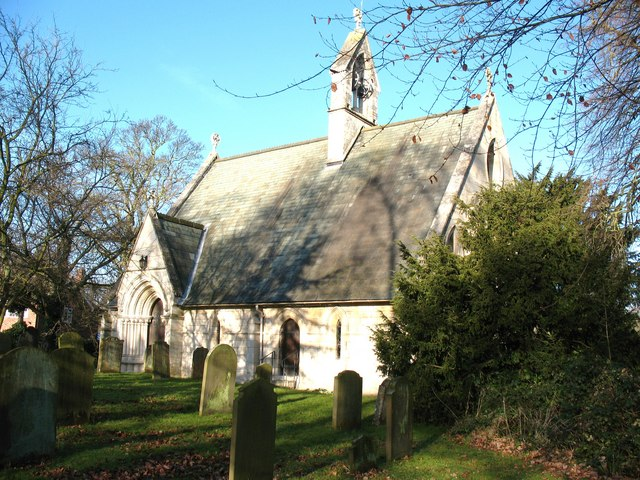
St Giles' Church, Skelton, York, which Christian published a book of illustrations of in 1846 and later restored, providing it with a new open timber roof in 1882

==== RIBA and the Ecclesiastical Commissioners ====
Christian was made an associate of the Royal Institute of British Architects in 1840 and a Fellow in 1850 at the age of 36. The RIBA, a prestigious national body of architects, had been formed in 1834 for the advancement of the profession and its members. Christian was elected vice-president of the institute in 1880 and reached the height of his career when he served as president of the RIBA from 1884 to 1886 and was awarded the institute's Royal Gold Medal in 1887. Many of Christian's over 2,000 works were for the Church of England. He carried out about 1,300 restorations and additions to churches throughout England and Wales and built some 90 new churches, as well as building, restoring and adding to many vicarages, deaneries, canonries and bishop's palaces. Much of his church work, particularly his 880 chancel restorations, was carried out in his capacity as Architect to the Ecclesiastical Commissioners, an influential post to which he was appointed in 1851 and which he held until his death in 1895. This gave him considerable control over the construction and restoration of many church buildings across the country at a time of church expansion and development in Victorian Britain. On his appointment, Christian moved his practice into the Commissioners' premises in Whitehall Place, Westminster, later converting nearby stables into his offices when the Commissioners needed more space. Here Christian was to remain for the rest of his life and during this time, in addition to his building and restoration work, he produced thousands of reports on designs for Church of England buildings that were submitted to the Commissioners for approval, completed surveys on the fabric of ancient churches including 14 cathedrals, and assessed many architectural competitions, work which continued to within four days of his death at the age of 80.

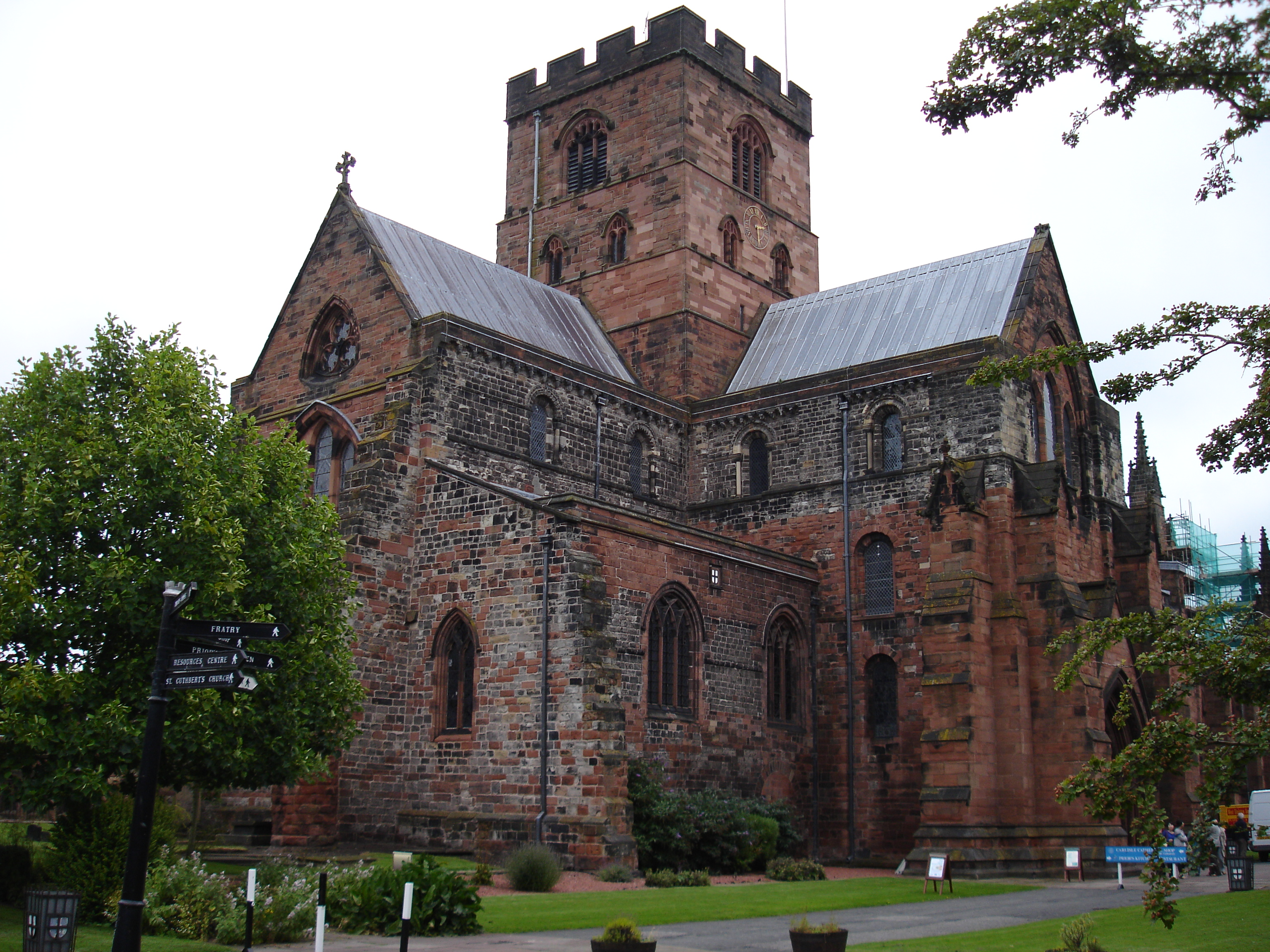
Carlisle Cathedral in Cumbria, where Christian carried out an important restoration 1853–1870

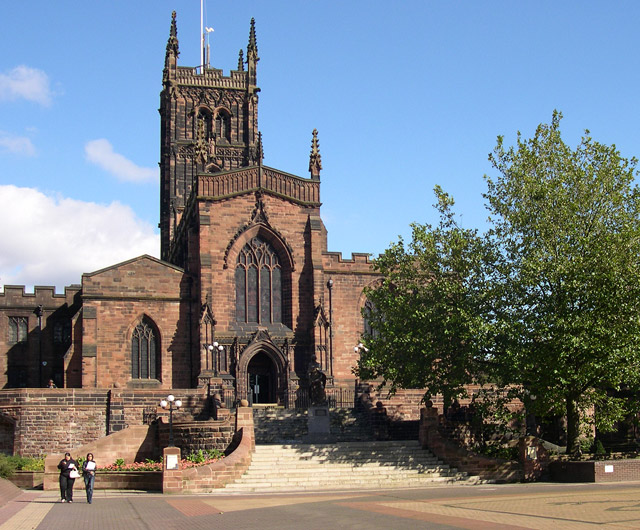
St Peter's Collegiate Church, Wolverhampton: major restoration by Christian from 1852, rebuilding of the chancel in 1865

==== Early successes ====
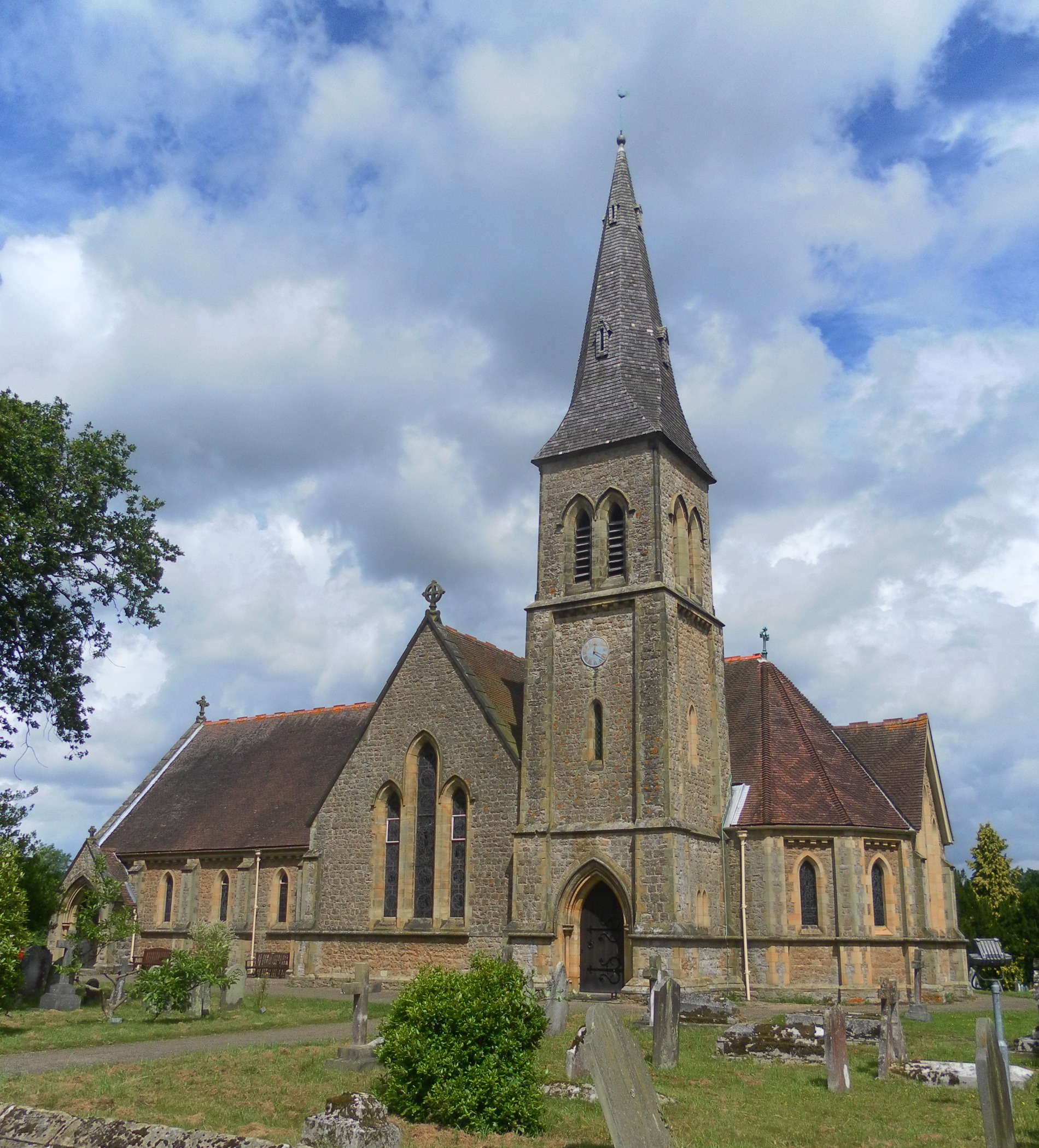
St John the Evangelist, Hildenborough, Kent: Christian's first church, completed in 1844

Christian's early work on churches in the 1840s led to the beginnings of his success. Soon after establishing himself in Bloomsbury Square he produced the winning design in the competition for St John the Evangelist, Hildenborough, in Kent, his first church, completed in 1844. The church was in Christian's favourite Early English Gothic style, built in stone with tall, pointed lancet windows and was of preaching church form, very broad, open and spacious inside, centring attention on the sermon during services. It reflected Christian's own preferences and beliefs as a low-church Anglican. His Evangelical religion was deeply woven into his life; he regularly worshipped at St John's Downshire Hill, in Hampstead, and was for more than 35 years a Sunday school teacher and superintendent there. He read Matthew Henry's Exposition of the Old and New Testaments (1708–10) daily and kept Sunday free of business. A fondness for incorporating into his designs improving mottoes, proverbs and biblical quotations perhaps expresses this aspect of him – 'Thwaitehead', the house he built for himself in Hampstead, displayed his favourite, "God's Providence Is Mine Inheritance", while his own office bore the motto "Trust And Strive".

After Hildenborough, Christian began work on Illustrations of Skelton Church, Yorkshire, his only book, published in 1846. St Giles' Church, Skelton, is an example of the Early English style of Gothic architecture which Christian admired and was built about the year 1247, probably by the masons of York Minster's south transept. Christian was later appointed to restore the church, providing it with a new open timber roof in 1882. Some of the drawings for the publication were done by J. K. Colling (1816–1905), a friend and fellow pupil from their time in Habershon & Brown's offices; Colling later provided foliage designs for the interior decoration of Christian's National Portrait Gallery. Christian gained recognition from these achievements, particularly from supporters of the Gothic Revival in architecture, and he went on to win the competition for the restoration of St Mary's Church, Scarborough in 1847 which he called "the cornerstone of success". That year, Christian was appointed Consulting Architect to the Lichfield Diocesan Church Building Society and also became a consulting architect to the Incorporated Church Building Society, a body established in 1818 for funding the building and restoration of churches throughout the country. He later was chairman of its Architects Committee.

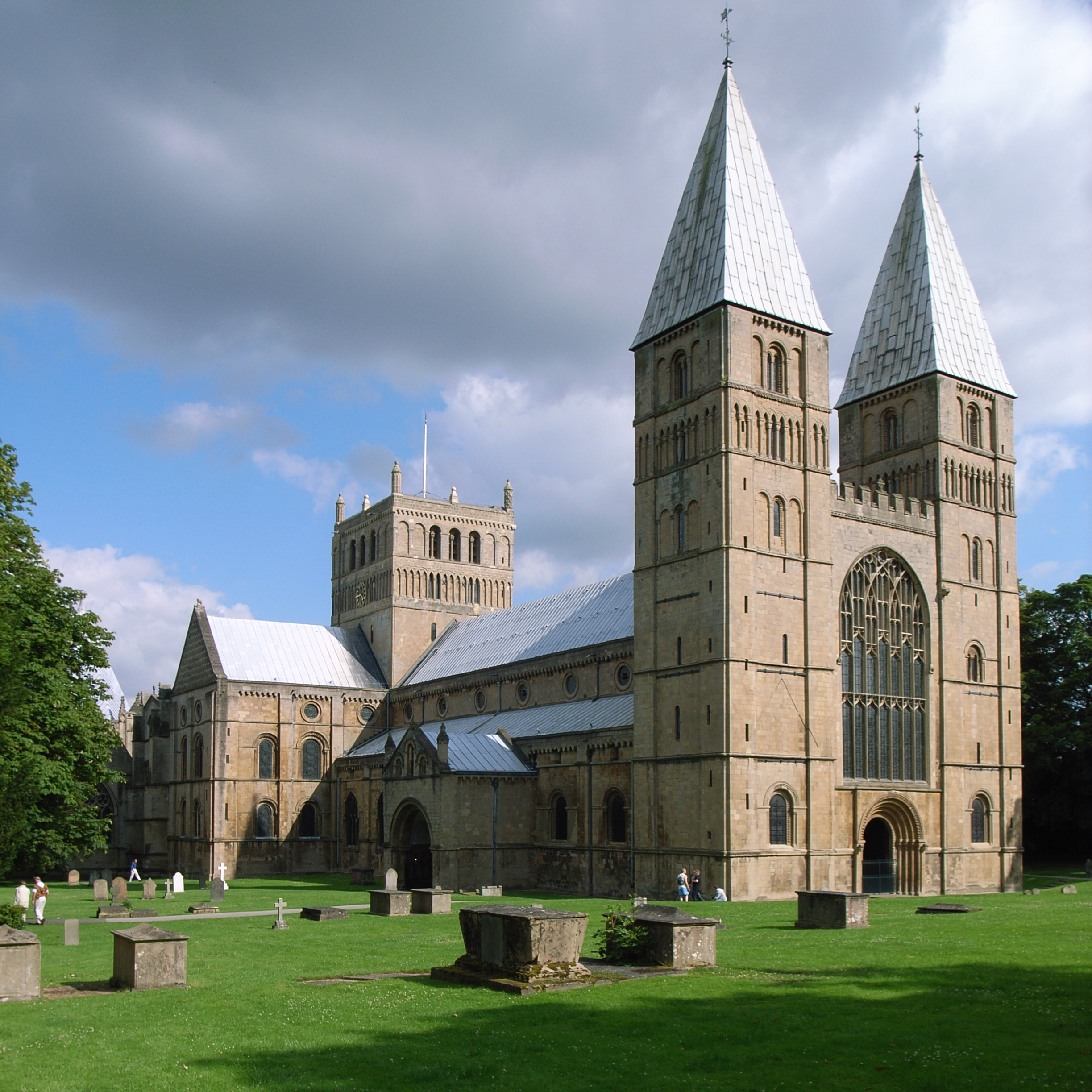
Christian's restoration of Southwell Minster took 37 years. The pyramidal spires of the western towers, seen here, replaced a lost feature of the church in 1881.

==== Southwell Minster and Carlisle Cathedral ====
Following his appointment to the Ecclesiastical Commissioners in 1851, Christian began a number of lengthy church restorations. That at the old St Peter's Collegiate Church in Wolverhampton was begun in 1852 and involved the rebuilding of the chancel, completed in the Decorated Gothic style in 1865. Notable were his restorations of Southwell Minster in Nottinghamshire, begun in 1851, and Carlisle Cathedral in Cumberland (1853–1870). At Southwell the work went on for 37 years, repairing the walls and masonry and re-roofing the building and chapter house to the original steeper pitch. The building of the pyramidal spires on the western towers (1881) restored a lost feature to the church: the originals had been destroyed in a fire of 1711 and Christian's work replaced flat roofs of 1802. In 1884 the church was created a cathedral for the new diocese of Southwell, covering Nottinghamshire and Derbyshire.

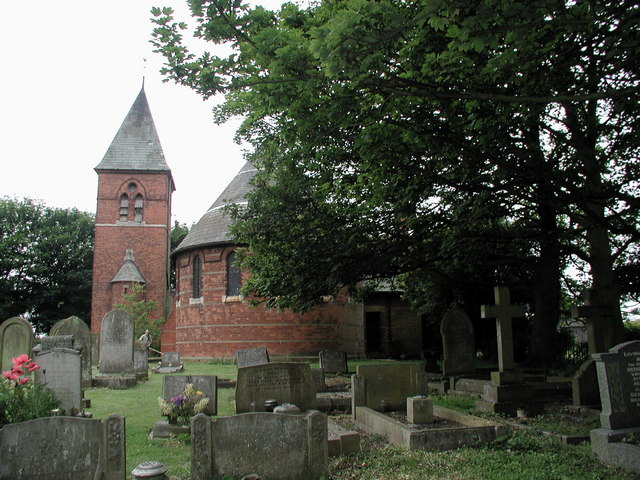
Holy Trinity Church, Sunk Island, in the East Riding of Yorkshire, designed by Christian and built in 1877

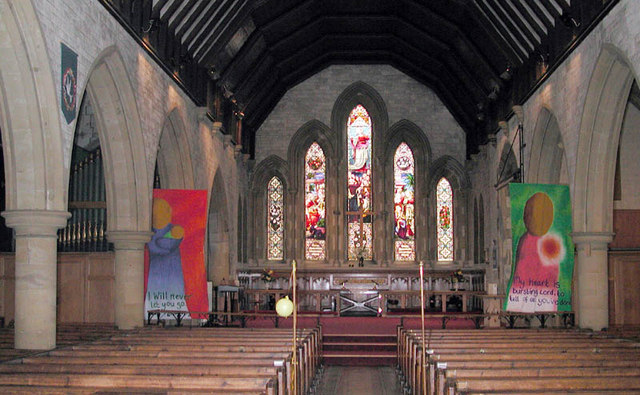
Interior view to the east of St Stephen's Church, Tonbridge, in Kent, built to the designs of Christian in 1851–52

==== Church designs ====
Among Christian's original churches are Holy Trinity, Sunk Island, in the East Riding of Yorkshire (completed in 1877), St Matthew's Church in Cheltenham, Gloucestershire (1878–79), and St Mark's Church, Leicester (1869–1872), all cited in his RIBA Royal Gold Medal award of 1887. Holy Trinity displays a typical red brick lancet style with nave and chancel under a single steep-pitched high roof, a deep apse to the chancel and a tower topped by a pyramidal spire. The tower has another familiar feature, a projecting circular stair-turret to its east side which is capped by its own small curved roof.

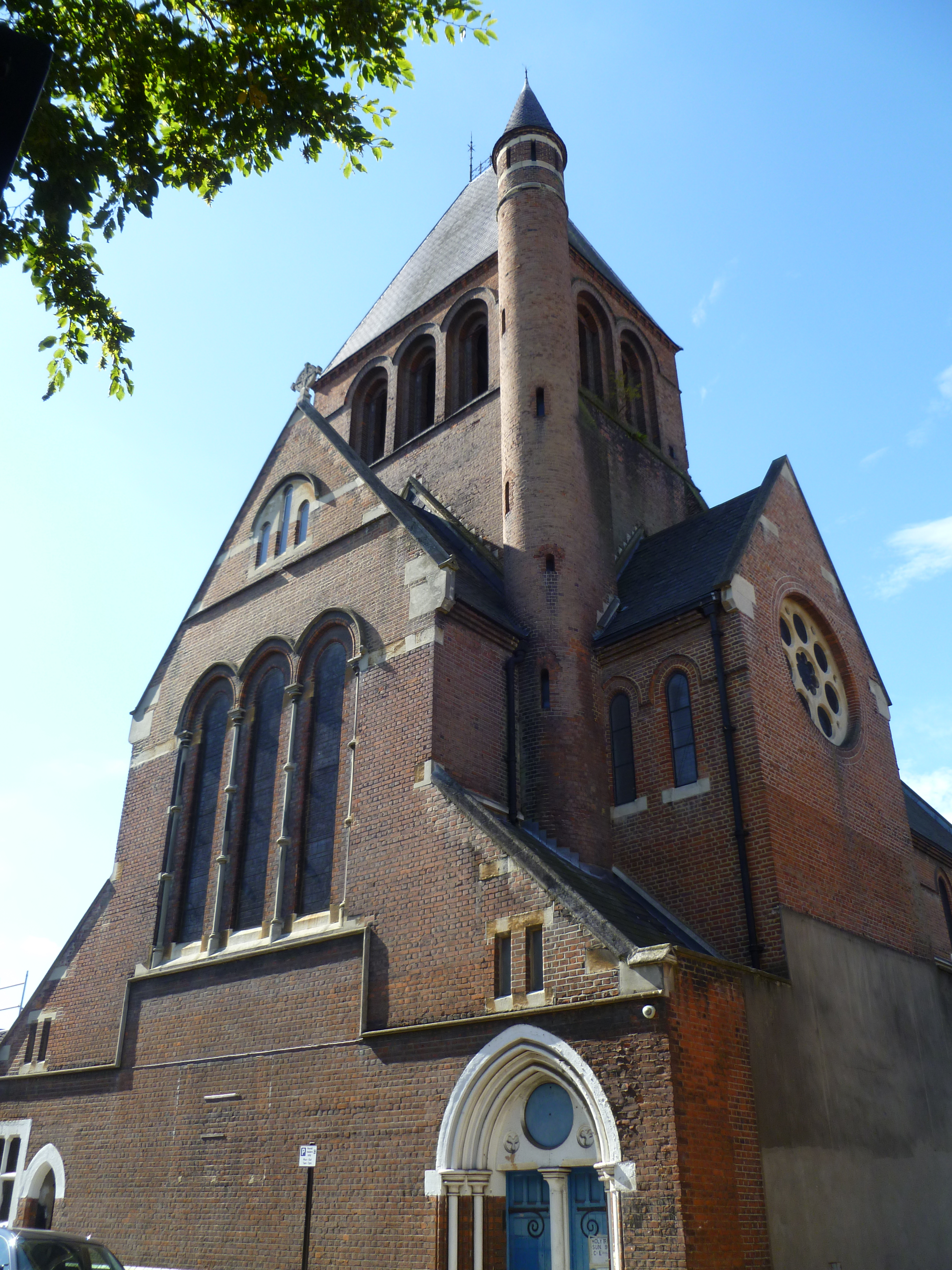
Holy Trinity Church, Dalston, by Ewan Christian 1878–79: crossing tower

The red-brick tower Christian provided for Holy Trinity Church, Dalston (1878–79), in the London Borough of Hackney, is set high over the crossing and is reminiscent of the work of Samuel Sanders Teulon (1812–1873). His red brick lancet style was also used in the little churches Christian built for new villages around The Wash in Lincolnshire, particularly at Holbeach St Marks and Christ Church at Gedney Dawsmere, both completed in 1869. The nave and deeply apsed chancel are under a single sweep of roof with scant interior division. They are provided with either a bellcote or spirelet rather than a dominant tower.

Despite his being thought to be mostly a red-brick architect, Christian used other facing materials where appropriate and when funding was adequate. The Church of St Matthew's (1878–79) in Cheltenham, praised by David Verey as "admirable and handsome", is built in white stone with ashlar dressings, while at All Saints, Viney Hill (1867), also in Gloucestershire, the church is appropriately built in the local sandstone. Like these, St Mark's Church (1869–1872) on Belgrave Gate, Leicester, uses different materials. St Mark's is unusually faced in dark purple-grey slate from the quarries of the donor, William Perry Herrick (1794–1876), in Charnwood Forest, Leicestershire The church displays a chancel apse, high roof and a tower topped by a Doulting limestone spire rising to 168 feet. St Mark's and St Matthew's were both designed as Evangelical preaching churches and have lofty naves with little division from the chancel, and focused attention on the pulpit. Inside, St Mark's has stone arcading with polished pink Shap granite columns, capitals with carved foliage and striped polychrome arches. Above them are alabaster roundels showing figures of saints and prophets. Tall marble shafts decorate the chancel and the walls of the interior display Christian's fondness for decorating his buildings with biblical texts.

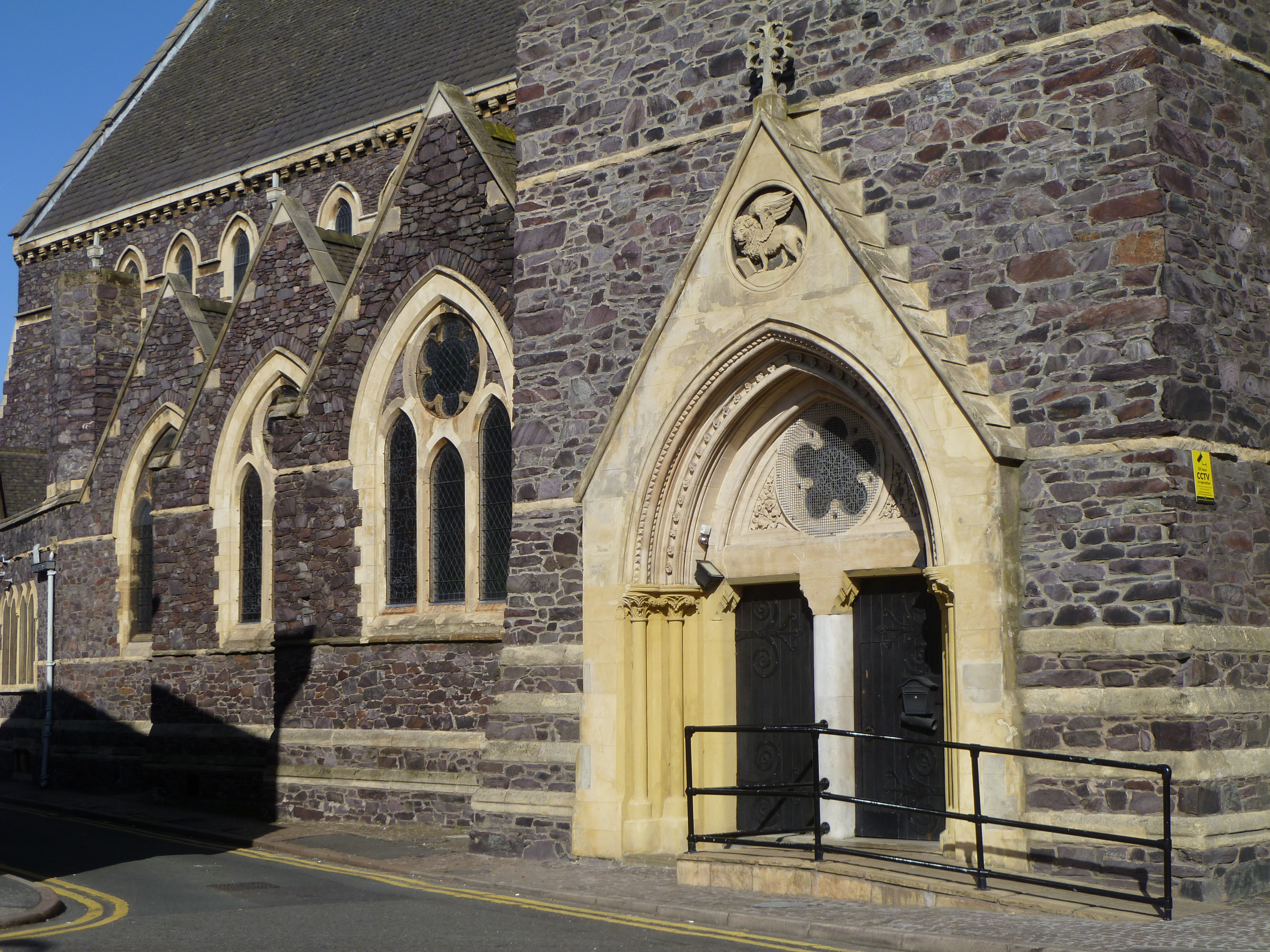
St Mark's Church, Leicester, 1869–1872, by Christian: the stepped-back gables of the south aisle receding from the tower porch

St Mark's southern and western boundaries were originally canted, so that the site narrowed from east to west and its length to decreasrf from south to north. Christian set the tower at the south-east corner of the church and provided three stepbacks from there towards the west which resulted in the church's stepped and gabled exterior to the south wall. Inside, the cant is disguised by the south aisle appearing to have two chapels projecting from it. At the west end Christian provided a triangular vestibule below the level of the west window to fit within the boundary; it was demolished when the church was extended to the west by one bay in 1904. St Mark's has been regarded as Christian's masterpiece among churches.

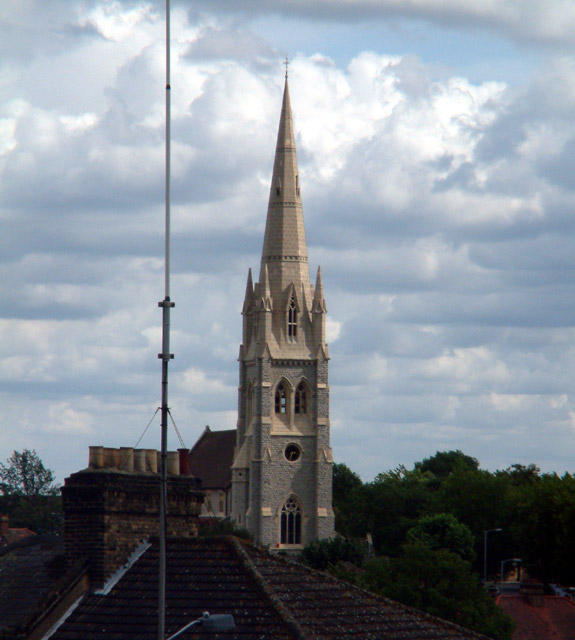
Christ Church, Forest Hill, in Lewisham (1852–1862), by Christian; the steeple was added in 1885

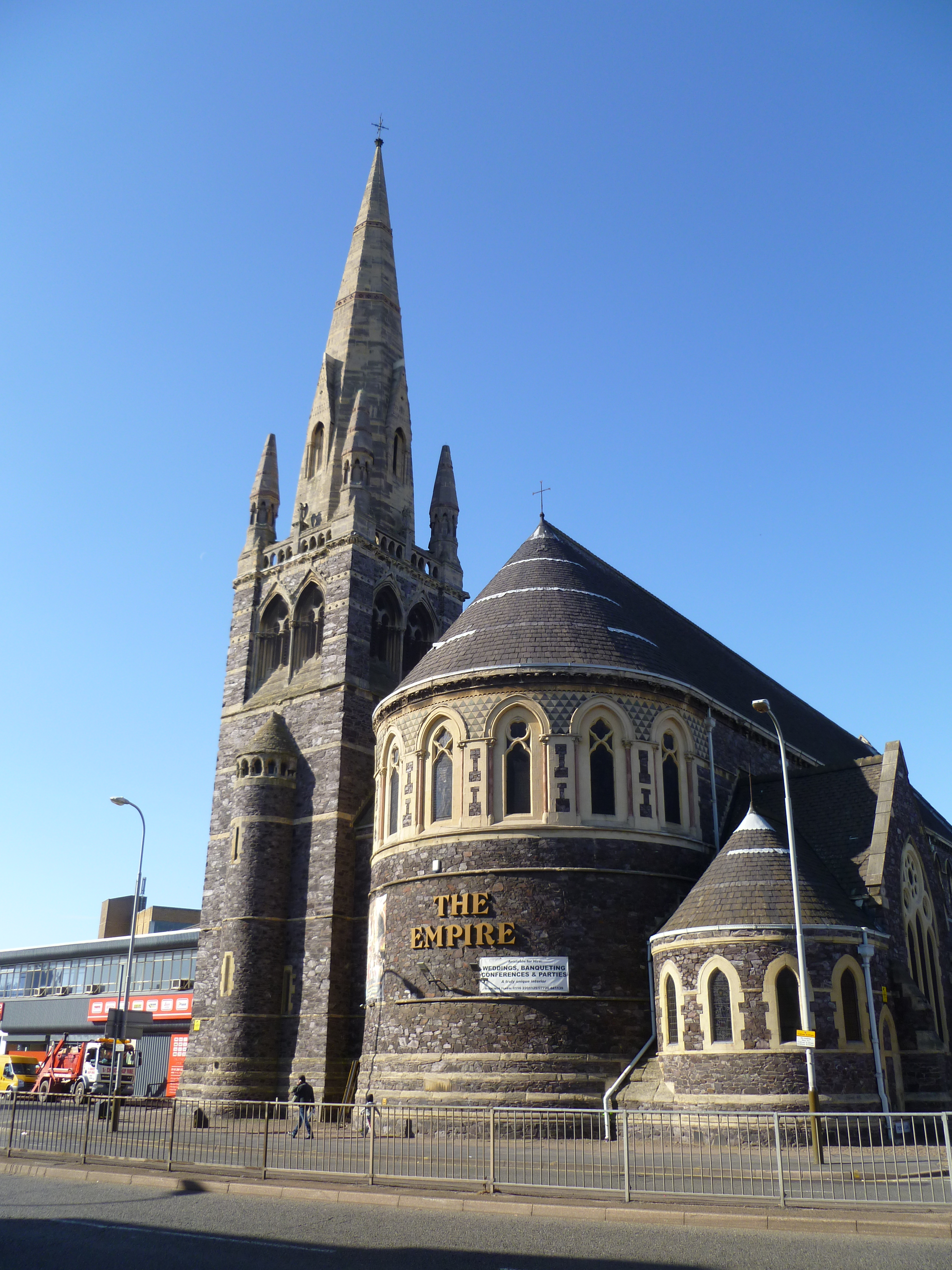
St Mark's Church, Leicester, 1869–1872, by Christian; the architect's masterpiece, showing the east front composition

==== Styles ====
Though the Early English style was Christian's favourite he was not restricted to it. Many of his original churches and church restorations display beautiful window tracery in other styles of Gothic architecture. An excellent example of his Decorated Gothic work can be seen at St John's Church, Kenilworth in Warwickshire built in 1851–52, using rough cut red sandstone for the body of the church with ashlar dressings and displaying a fine south-west steeple with a broach spire. Typically the interior is open and spacious with little division between nave and chancel. Other churches by Christian in the Decorated style include the prominently sited Christ Church, Forest Hill (1852–1862) in the London Borough of Lewisham, built in Kentish Ragstone with an impressive tower and spire of 1885, and the charming St Paul's Church, Swanley Village in Kent completed in 1861 with a west tower added 1862–1865 which is built of rubble stone with bands of red and yellow brick and topped by shingled pyramidal spire.

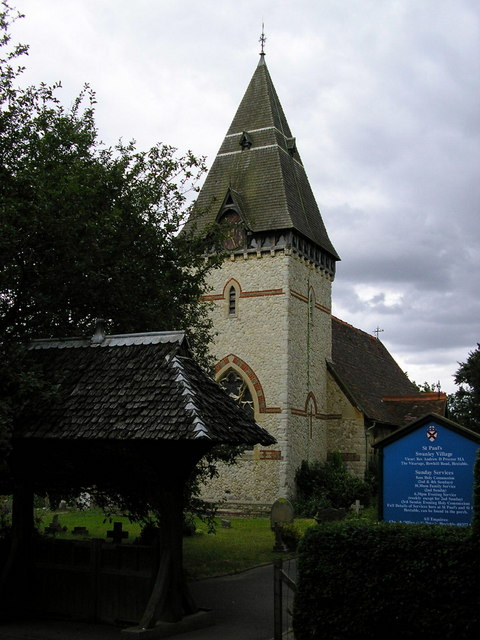
St Paul's Church, Swanley Village in Kent, 1861 by Christian; the tower was added in 1865

Christian also worked in the Perpendicular Gothic style, providing some Perpendicular traceried windows for the church of St James the Greater (1883), in Oaks-in-Charnwood, Leicestershire, which was built in local granite and has a fine west tower. He also did so for the church of St Dionis, Parsons Green in the London Borough of Hammersmith and Fulham, built in red brick with stone dressings in 1884–85, its tower completed after Christian's death in 1896. For the restoration of the ancient Church of St Laurence (1860) in Warkworth, Northumberland, Christian provided a group of chancel east windows in the round-arched Norman style, and designed a Neo-Norman organ case for Romsey Abbey in Hampshire in 1858. In 1876–77, he added a Norman-style family chapel and vestry to St Andrew's Church near Weston Park in Staffordshire, to match the classical work of 1701 a little better than with Gothic. The composition of Minor Canonries (1878–1880), that Christian designed as residences for canons of St Paul's Cathedral, London in nearby Amen Court is in the manner of Norman Shaw's Domestic Revival architecture, inspired by original Elizabethan and Jacobean buildings. Here Christian provided a careful design in red brick, set along the court, with large mullioned and transomed windows; patterned gables and tall chimneys; a tower topped by his usual pyramidal roof and elegant shell hoods over the doors. The court is entered through a pretty gateway, also in red brick, with a Tudor-style arch which has an oriel window above on both sides.

In a similar Elizabethan style is the bank (1884–1886) that Christian designed for Messrs Cox & Co, bankers to the army, in Whitehall, Westminster, though here the building is faced in stone. The former bank is set at the north corner of Craig's Court and has three large gables decorated with a raised grid pattern similar to the work at Amen Court, perhaps alluding to the timber-framed gables of Elizabethan buildings. Below the gables there is a wide expanse of mullioned and transomed windows for each of the upper floors. An extension was added to the corner under a smaller gable in 1900, designed by J. H. Christian. Also in an attractive Shaw style were two large convalescent homes which Christian designed, the first at Folkestone in Kent (1881, chapel added 1888) and the second, the Surrey Convalescent Home at Seaford, East Sussex (1888–1891, demolished in the 1960s), both had the usual bold display of heavy mullioned and transomed stone windows, big gables, tall chimneystacks and dormers. Finally, Christian's National Portrait Gallery in London as noted above was designed in a striking Italian Renaissance style.

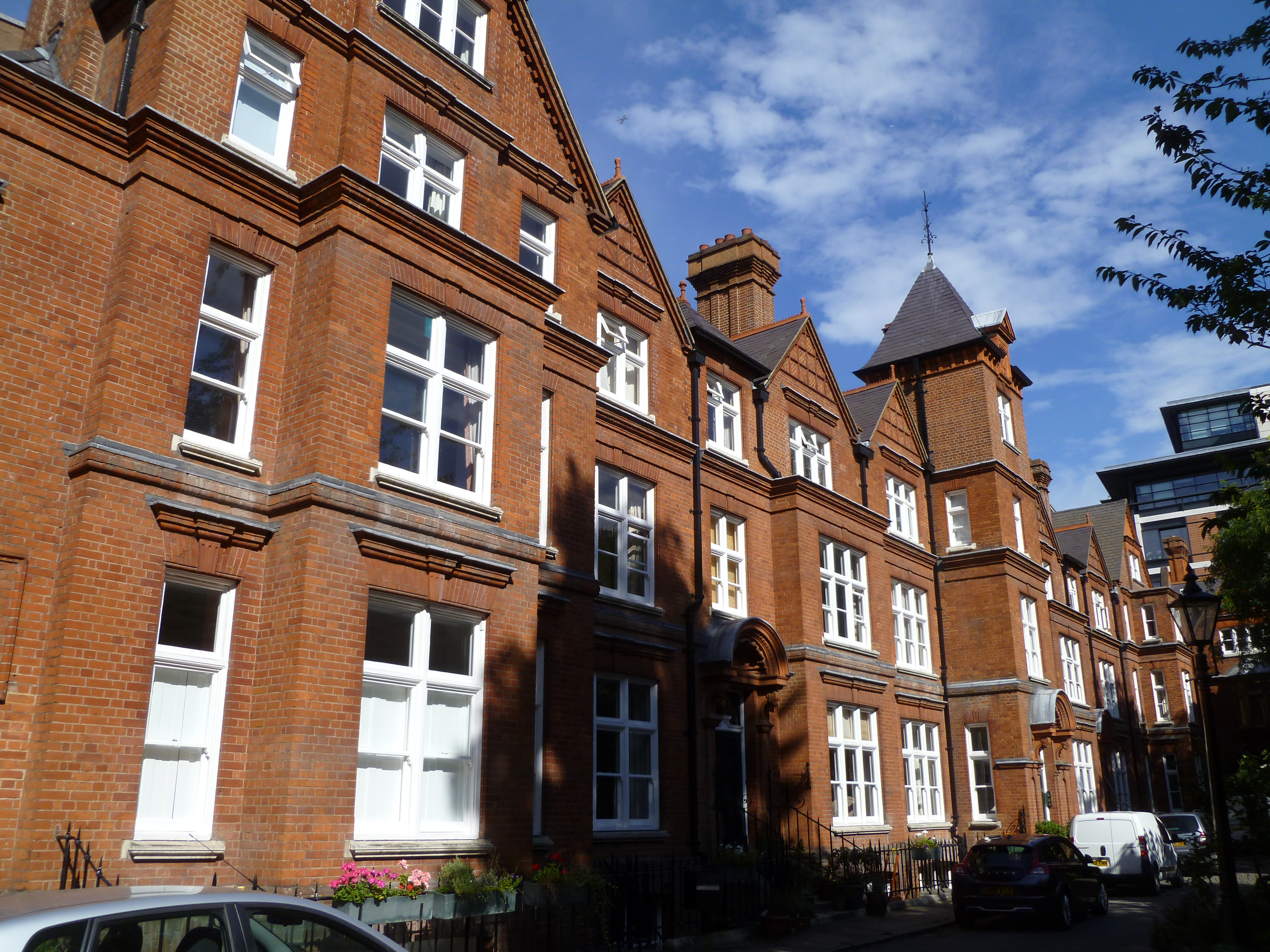
Minor Canonries, Amen Court, near Ludgate Hill in the City of London, designed by Christian 1878–1880

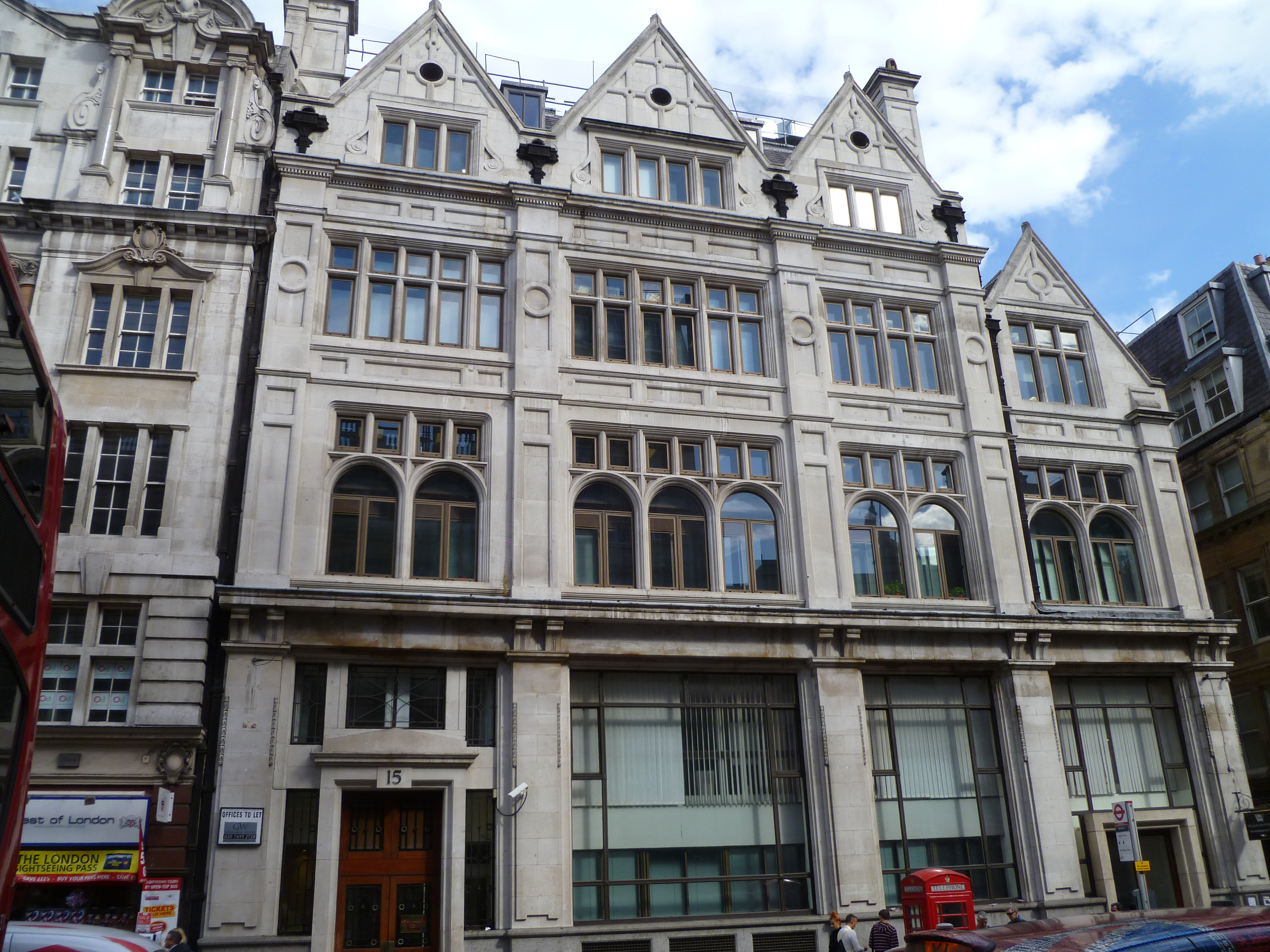
The former Cox & Co Bank in Whitehall, Westminster, designed by Christian, 1884–86; lower extension on the corner of Craig's Court, 1900 by J. H. Christian

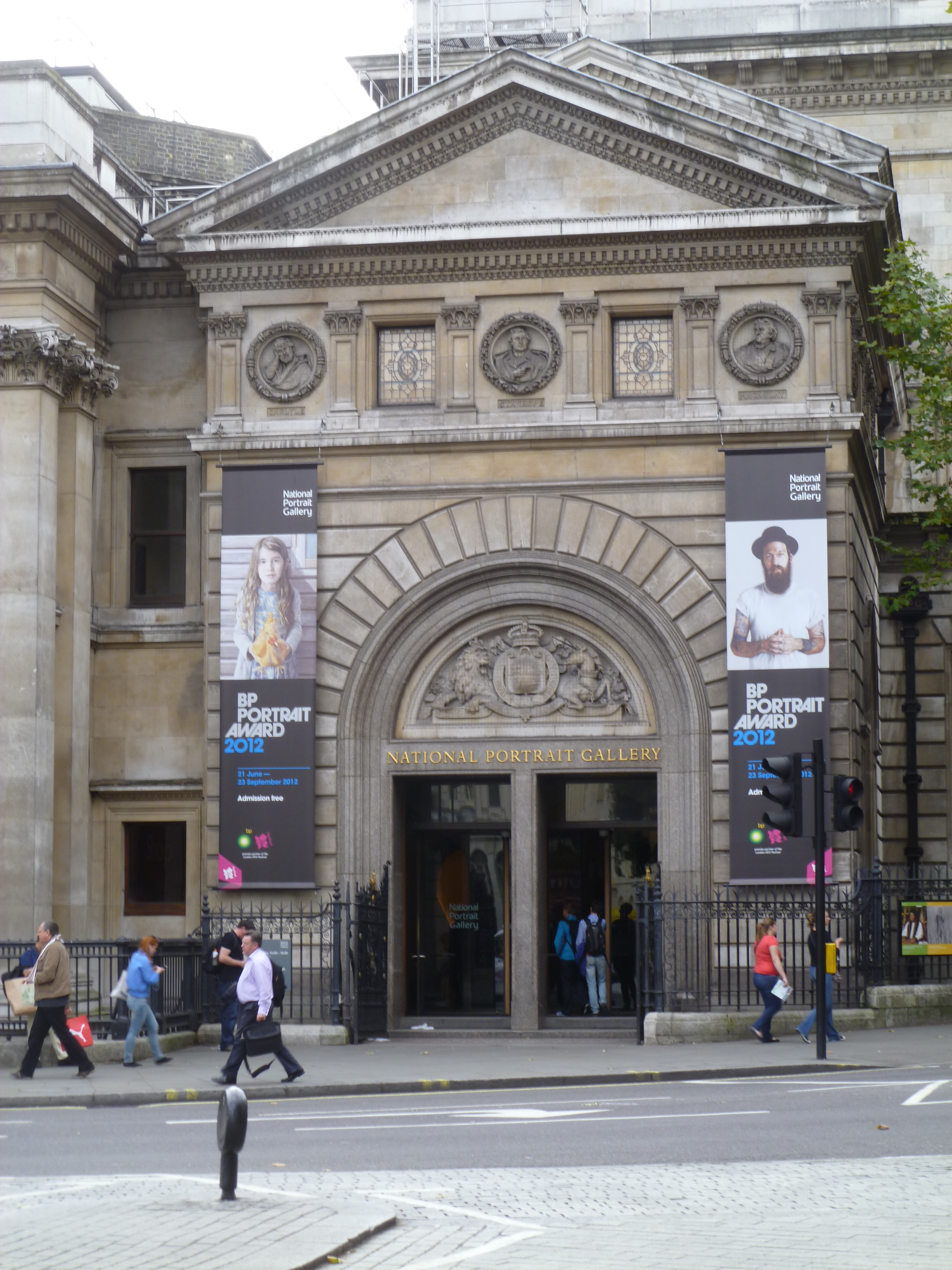
National Portrait Gallery, main entrance in St Martin's Place, Westminster, designed by Christian 1890–1895

==== House designs ====
Though Christian is often referred to as being a church architect he also designed about 120 houses, mainly for wealthy gentlemen. Many were built in a heavy Tudor style with large stone mullioned and transomed windows, steep roofs with dormers and tall brick chimney stacks and displaying decorative timber-framing and tile-hanging. One of his earliest was Market Lavington Manor in Wiltshire (completed in 1865) for Edward Pleydell Bouverie (1818–1889) a Liberal MP, Church Estates Commissioner and from 1869 an Ecclesiastical Commissioner. The house has an impressive gabled exterior in red brick with blue brick diapering. Christian commented in his own list of works that the house had 'brought many others in its train'. His work at Glyndebourne, East Sussex in 1876 for William Langham Christie (1830–1913) involved encasing the original Tudor house in a new Tudor style brick exterior with large bay windows added to give more light to the interior. Malwood (1883–84), a house Christian designed near Minstead in Hampshire (not to be confused with Castle Malwood which is a different house) was built for the Liberal statesman Sir William Harcourt (1827–1904) and shows the influence of the architect Norman Shaw's 'Old English' style. Christian designed the building for its setting in the ridge-top clearing of a wood, close to the ancient earthworks of an Iron Age hill fort. It displays extensive half-timbering above a red brick ground floor with stone dressings and the steep roofs have large gables and dormers and clusters of tall brick chimneys.

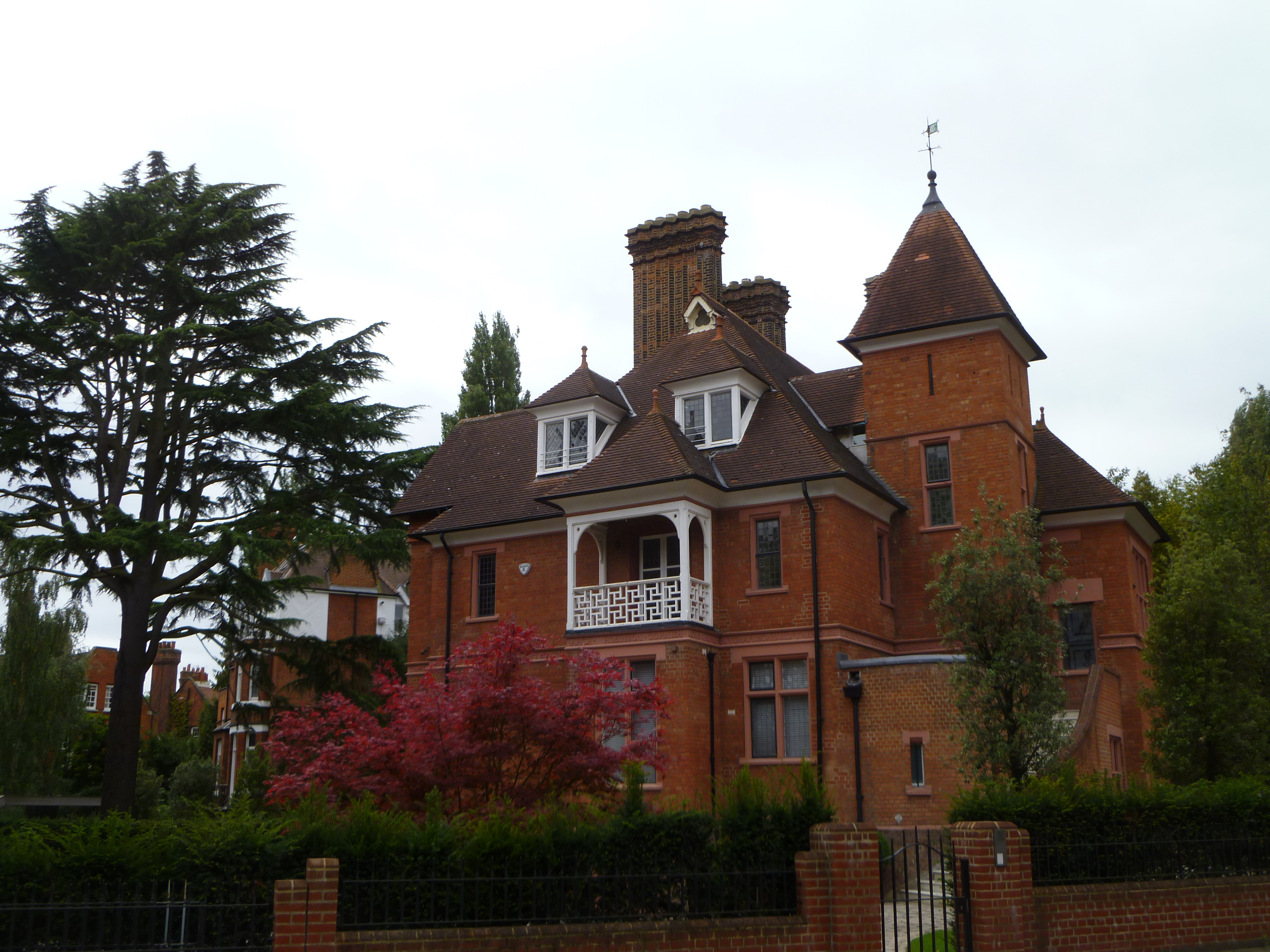
'Thwaitehead', the house Christian built for himself in Well Walk, Hampstead in 1881–82

Christian's own house, 'Thwaitehead', named after his mother's home village in Lancashire, was built by him in 1881–82 on an excellent site in Well Walk, Hampstead, overlooking Hampstead Heath. (The view was obscured in 1904 when The Pryors – large Edwardian mansion blocks – was built opposite.) The house is picturesquely designed in red brick and is set at an angle to the corner of the road with large stone mullioned windows and a tile-hung projecting bay. The reddish-brown tiled roofs of different levels have hipped dormers and massive ribbed chimney stacks (in dark grey-brown brick to match the roofs). A very typical tower with its own pyramidal roof is placed asymmetrically at a corner of the building and there is a charming first-floor open trellis-work balcony which had views of the heath. The band of text which ran around the building at first-floor level and included Christian's favourite "God's Providence is Mine Inheritance" has been restored in a restoration of the building by Belsize Architects. Thwaitehead's design predominantly displays the influence of the Domestic Revival style of architecture made popular at that time through the work of Richard Norman Shaw (1831–1912) and W. E. Nesfield (1835–1888). Shaw also lived in Hampstead in a house that he designed for himself (completed in 1876) and his house for the children's book illustrator Kate Greenaway in nearby Frognal, Hampstead, built in 1884–85, displays pretty tile-hanging and a balcony and is in its character similar to Christian's own house, built three years before.

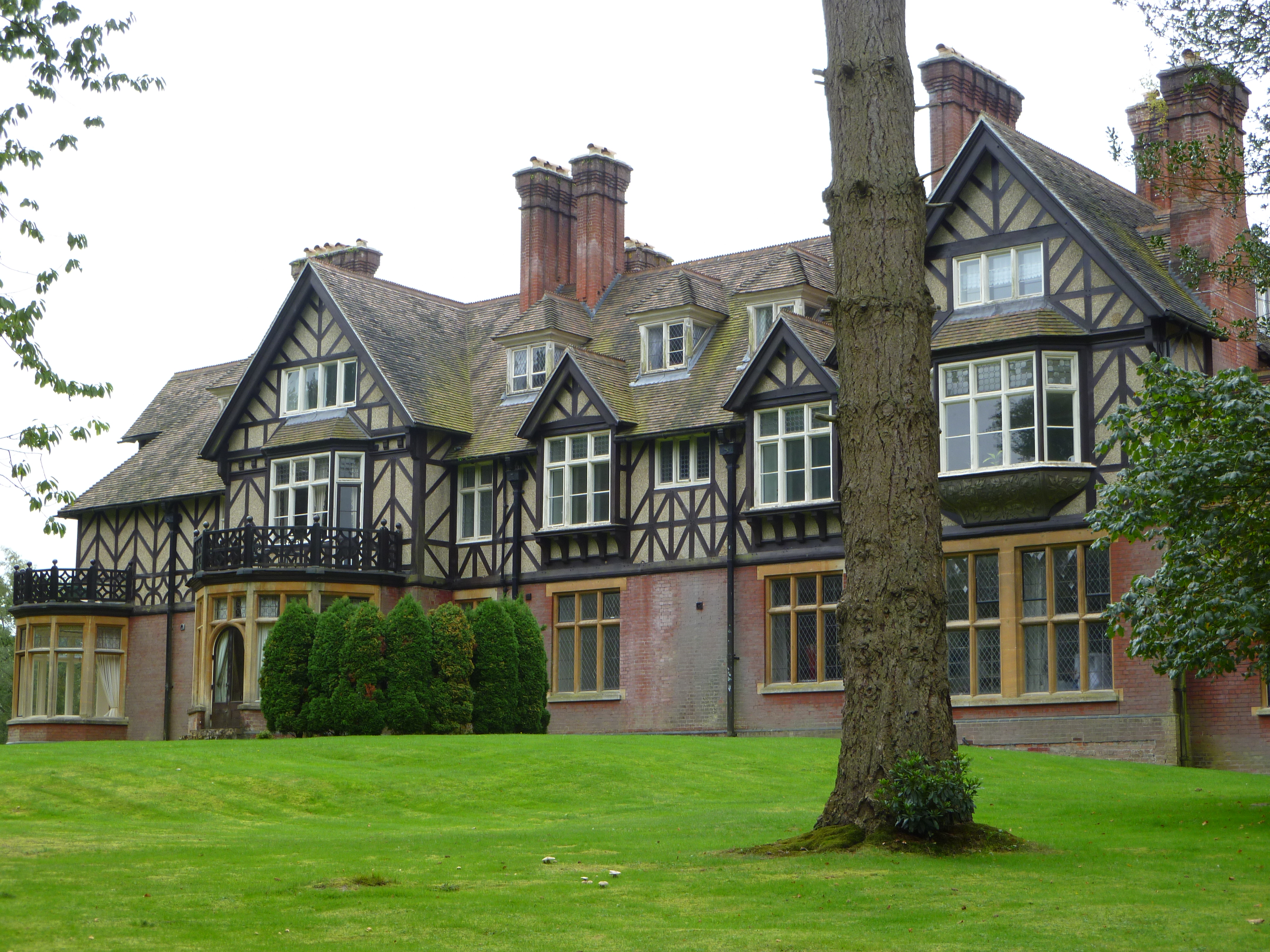
Malwood (1883–84), near Minstead in the New Forest, Hampshire, designed by Christian for the Liberal politician Sir William Harcourt

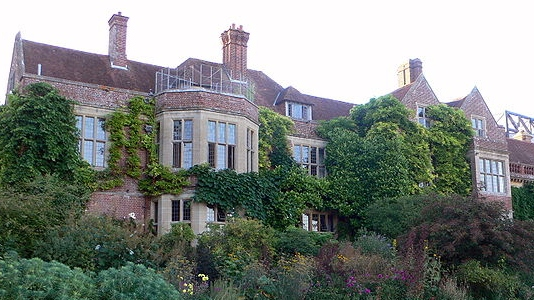
Glyndebourne, East Sussex: Christian made extensive alterations to the house in 1876, providing it with large bay windows

==== Surveys and architectural competitions ====
Christian's colossal work load required enormous amounts of energy to match it and despite having some bouts of serious illness as he got older the architect continued to meet the demands of his large practice. Typical of this is his appointment in 1887 as Consulting Architect to the Charity Commissioners for whom he produced a great report on the City of London churches which was said to be 'the most complete account [of them] ever written'. Christian personally inspected the 54 churches, strenuous and sometimes dangerous work, undertaken when he was over 70 years old. Christian carried out restoration work on several of these churches, a notably restrained and respectful one being that of 1892–1895 to Sir Christopher Wren's St Martin Ludgate on Ludgate Hill. This contrasts with his rather insensitive restoration work of 1851 and 1866 to Nicholas Hawksmoor's Christ Church, Spitalfields in east London where he removed the old galleries and box pews and made alterations to the original windows. The architect's personal survey of the old unstable tower of Chichester Cathedral in 1861 could have resulted in his death as it collapsed in a gale the day after he had climbed it.} Adding to his burdens, Christian also acted as an assessor and judge in important architectural competitions throughout the country, though not always satisfactorily. In that for an Anglican Cathedral in Liverpool (1884–1886) his choice of Sir William Emerson's odd design of mixed styles for the building, which was to be built on a sensitive site close to St George's Hall, caused a controversy within the RIBA which was aired in the press. The chosen design was not built and the present cathedral by Sir Giles Gilbert Scott (1880–1960), begun in 1903 on a different site, stemmed from a later competition. Christian's report on the competition for St Mary's Episcopal Cathedral, Edinburgh (1872) was thought to be 'a model of its kind' though the donors chose the design by Sir George Gilbert Scott (1811–1878) before seeing Christian's report which favoured George Edmund Street's design. The competition for a new Admiralty and War Office building in Whitehall, London, in 1884 involved Christian in a selection committee as president of the RIBA. The committee were faced with a difficult two-stage process with 128 entries to assess. Despite their arduous and careful work the committee experienced much hostility towards their choices and, having made the final selection, parliamentary economic concerns led to the collapse of the scheme (two separate buildings were later constructed), thus wasting the time and effort of Christian and his colleagues.

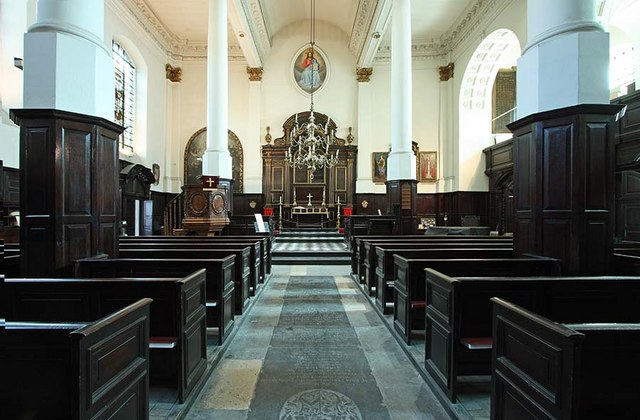
St Martin's Ludgate (interior view east) in the City of London: Christian restored this church 1892–1895

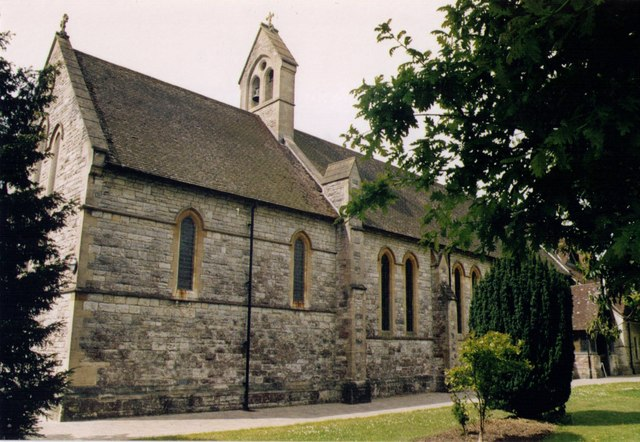
St John the Baptist, Locks Heath, in Hampshire: one of Ewan Christian's last churches, completed a few months after his death in 1895 and still in the Early English style like his first church

=== Assessment ===
Christian has rarely been regarded as a genius in the architectural world, and his work has been much criticised since his death as being generally dull and lifeless and often lacking elegance and grace. The Pevsner Architectural Guides of The Buildings of England series contain some severe criticism of many of his works, especially his church restorations, as at St Peter and St Paul's Church in Shelford, Nottinghamshire, where the entry refers to a ruthless restoration by "the callous Mr Christian" while that for St Mary's, Aldingbourne in West Sussex refers to Christian's "horrible restoration" of 1867 leaving the exterior "maimed and valueless" and claimed his work on the windows to have been carried out "with real hatred"

During his lifetime, some thought his buildings to be uninspired and his church restorations insensitive – on this subject William Morris (1834–1896) once wrote that Christian was "a great criminal" in relation to his supervision of work at St Andrew's Church, Deopham in Norfolk. Modern architectural historians have thought Christian to be "normally pedestrian in his output" and have stated that "little of his immense output shows imagination".

Christian was at least regarded as a safe pair of hands for any commission committed to him and was always seen to be reliable, competent and conscientious in his work. He was renowned for the solidity of his constructions and hated shoddy workmanship and 'sham' frontages. His concern for solid building was also an influence on his assessments for the Ecclesiastical Commissioners, as shown when he annoyed William Butterfield by insisting that the architect thicken the walls in his design of St John's Church (1876) at Clevedon, Somerset.

It should be remembered that Christian was a prolific architect and that there would naturally be some pedestrian works among such a huge output, as there were with other prolific architects of the Victorian period, including the most eminent and acclaimed of them such as Butterfield, George Edmund Street and Sir George Gilbert Scott. Also, his buildings and restorations for the Ecclesiastical Commissioners had to stay within strict budgets and this did not permit much elaboration in his designs. Christian's employers no doubt expected him to carry out his restorations to a set standard which would include the removal of old box pews and galleries and the providing of new seating and furnishings, as in the architect's work at Christ Church, Spitalfields. He scrupulously kept within his employers' budget and was always concerned to meet the client's needs and requirements for a commission, as is shown in his work for W. H. Alexander on the National Portrait Gallery.

Christian was more than capable of producing outstanding architecture when the commission and the funding allowed him the opportunity, as at St Mark's Church in Leicester and at St Matthew's in Cheltenham; and as his own house in Hampstead proves. Even his first church, St John the Evangelist in Hildenborough, Kent, clearly displays this quality as the historian John Julius Norwich emphasised when he urged avid devotees of churches designed by the more famous Victorian architects "to take a long, close look at this extraordinary building" which he thought in its open interior plan to be "astonishing for the 1840s". He calls Ewan Christian "a revolutionary with a touch of genius".

== Works ==
=== England ===
Ordered by county

- St Peter and St Paul's Church, Alconbury, Bedfordshire (1877)
- All Saints' Church, Caddington, Bedfordshire (1875)
- St Mary the Virgin Church, Eastfield, Cambridgeshire (1859)
- Casterton Grange, Casterton, Cumbria (1848)
- St James the Apostle's Church, Bonsall, Derbyshire (1861–2)
- St Michael's Church, Stanton by Bridge, Derbyshire (1865–6)
- St Pancras' Church, Alton Pancras, Dorset (1875)
- St George's Church, Bourton, Dorset (1878)
- St Thomas' Church, East Orchard, Dorset (1859)
- All Saints' Church, Gussage All Saints, Dorset (1860)
- St Mary the Virgin Church, Piddlehinton, Dorset (1867)
- All Saints' Church, Piddletrenthide, Dorset (1880)
- Christ Church, Weymouth, Dorset (1874)
- St Michael's Church, Heighington, County Durham (1872–5)
- St Peter's Church, Preston Village, East Sussex (1878)
- St Peter and St Paul's Church, Hellingly, East Sussex (1869)
- Holy Trinity Church, Sunk Island, East Yorkshire (1876–7)
- St Matthew's Church, Cheltenham, Gloucestershire (1878–9)
- St Michael and All Angels' Church and Vicarage, Poulton, Gloucestershire (1868)
- All Saints' Church, Viney Hill, Gloucestershire (1865)
- All Saints' Church, East Meon, Hampshire (1869–70)
- St Mary the Virgin Church, Greywell, Hampshire (1870–1)
- St Peter & St Paul Church, Hambledon, Hampshire (1876)
- St John the Evangelist Church, Langrish, Hampshire (1869–70)
- Romsey Abbey, Romsey, Hampshire (1858)
- Christ Church, Winchester, Hampshire (1861)
- St Mary Magdalene Church, Eardisley, Herefordshire (1863)
- Holy Trinity Church, Hertford Heath, Hertfordshire (1863)
- St Mary's Church, Goudhurst, Kent (1865–70)
- St John the Evangelist Church, Hildenborough, Kent (1844)
- St Paul's Church, Swanley Village, Kent (1861)
- St Peter's Church, Belgrave, Leicester (1860)
- St Mark's Church, Leicester (1869–72)
- The Assumption of St Mary Church, Hinckley, Leicestershire (1877–8)
- All Saints' Church, Hoby with Rotherby, Leicestershire (1863–4)
- St James the Great Church, Oaks in Charnwood, Leicestershire (1880)
- St Paul's Church, Woodhouse Eaves, Leicestershire (1880)
- Christ Church, Gedney Dawsmere, Lincolnshire (1869)
- St Mark's Church, Holbeach St Marks, Lincolnshire (1868–9)
- St Matthew's Church, Holbeach St Matthew, Lincolnshire (1868–9)
- St Mary's Church, Horncastle, Lincolnshire (1860)
- Christ Church, Spitalfields, London (E1) (1851, 1866)
- St Luke's Church, Nutford Place, Marylebone, London (W2)
- Holy Trinity Church, Dalston, London (E8) (1878–9)
- St Antholin's Church, Nunhead, London (SE15) (1878)
- Holy Trinity Church, Lamorbey, London (1879)
- Christ Church, Forest Hill, London (SE23) (1852–62, 1885)
- St Dionis, Parsons Green, London (SW6) (1884–5)
- St James' Church, Castle Acre, Norfolk
- St John the Baptist Church, Abthorpe, Northamptonshire (1869–71)
- St Laurence's Church, Warkworth, Northumberland (1860)
- Holy Trinity Church, Scarborough, North Yorkshire (1880)
- St Giles' Church, Skelton, North Yorkshire (1880)
- St Mary with Holy Apostles' Church, Scarborough, North Yorkshire (1848–52)
- St Peter's Church, Shelford, Nottinghamshire (1876–8)
- Southwell Minster, Southwell, Nottinghamshire (1851–88)
- St Mary's Church, Bampton, Oxfordshire (1867–9)
- St Matthew's Church, Langford, Oxfordshire (1864)
- St James the Great's Church, South Leigh, Oxfordshire (1871–2)
- Church of All Saints, Terrington, North Yorkshire (1868–70)
- St Mary Magdalene's Church, Wardington, Oxfordshire (1887–9)
- St Peter's Church, Brooke, Rutland (1879)
- St Bartholomew's Church, Butterton, Staffordshire (1871–3)
- Vicarage, Great Barr, Staffordshire (1847)
- St Andrew's Church, Weston-under-Lizard, Staffordshire (1876–7)
- St Peter's Collegiate Church, Wolverhampton, Staffordshire (1852–65)
- All Saints' Church, Tilford, Farnham, Surrey (1867)
- St John's Church, Churt, Farnham, Surrey (1868)
- St Nicholas' Church, Austrey, Warwickshire (1844–45)
- St Michael's Church, Bishop's Itchington, Warwickshire (1872)
- St Theobald & St Chad's Church, Caldecote, Warwickshire (1857)
- St Michael and All Angels' Church, Claverdon, Warwickshire (1877–8)
- St John's Church, Kenilworth, Warwickshire (1851–2)
- St Nicholas' Church, Nuneaton, Warwickshire (1852–3)
- Messrs Cox & Co. Bank, Whitehall, Westminster (1884–6)
- St Mary the Virgin Church, Aldingbourne, West Sussex (1867)
- St Mary the Virgin Church, Calstone Wellington, Wiltshire (1884–5)
- All Saints' Church, Farley, Wiltshire (1875)
- St Mary the Virgin Church and Manor House, Market Lavington, Wiltshire (1860, 1865)
- St Peter's Church, Pitton, Wiltshire (1878–80)
- St Peter's Church, Inkberrow, Worcestershire (1887)
- St Nicolas' Church, Kings Norton, Worcestershire (1863)
- St James' Church, Norton, Worcestershire (1874–5)
- St John's Church, St John's, Worcestershire (1884)

=== Isle of Man ===
- Abbey Memorial Church, Ballasalla
- Chapel of Ease, Cronkbourne
- Christ Church, Dhoon
- St Thomas' Church, Douglas
- Christchurch. Laxey
- New Church, Marown

=== Wales ===
- St Mary's Church, Haverfordwest, Pembrokeshire (1881–9)
- St Andrew canonry, Llandaff, South Glamorgan
- St Cross canonry, Llandaff, South Glamorgan

=== Germany ===
- English Church, Bad Homburg, Hesse (1861–5)

== Gallery ==
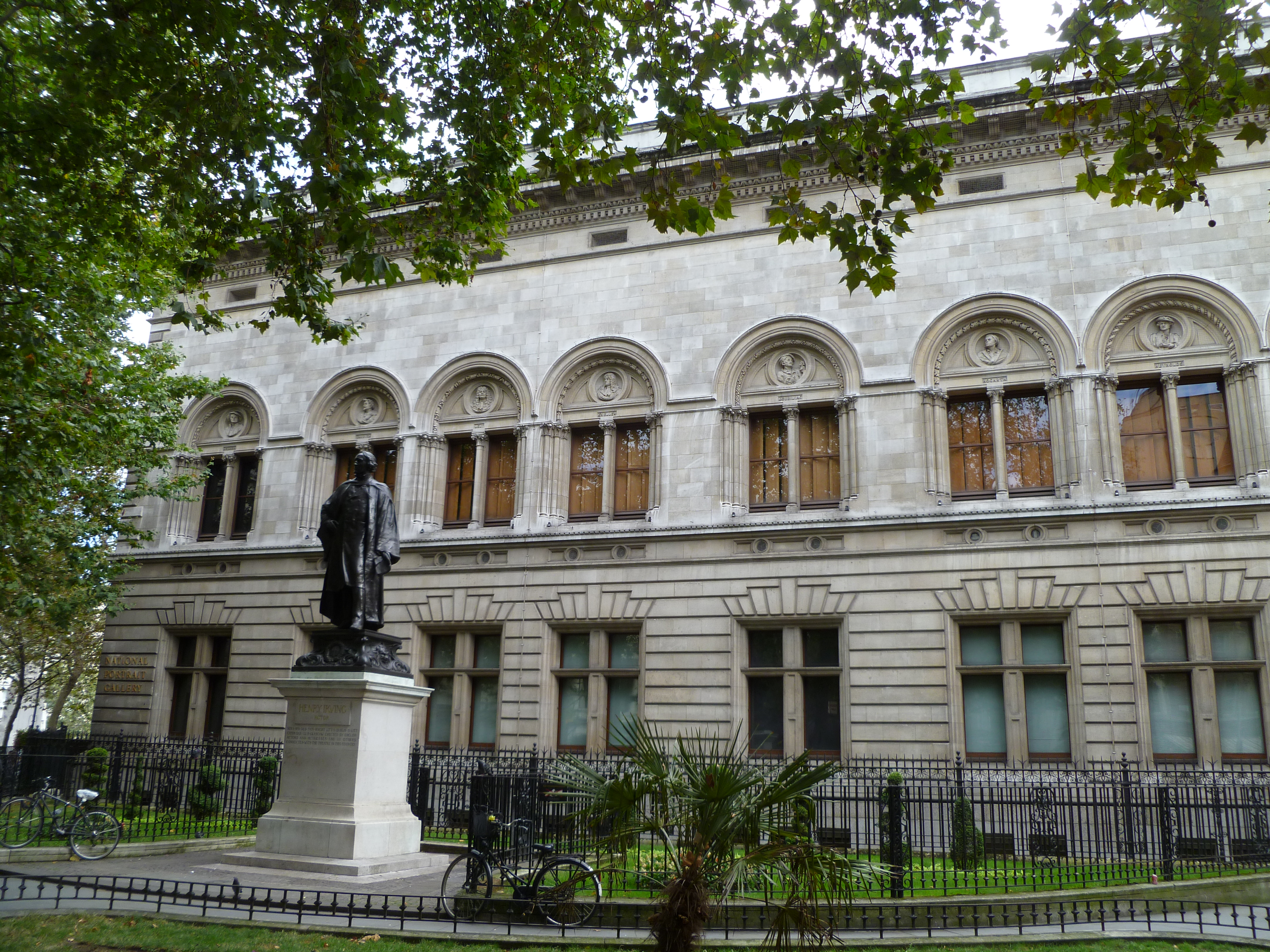
National Portrait Gallery, London, 1890–95 by Ewan Christian, north front towards Charing Cross Road with the statue of Sir Henry Irving (1908–10 by Sir Thomas Brock) set before it

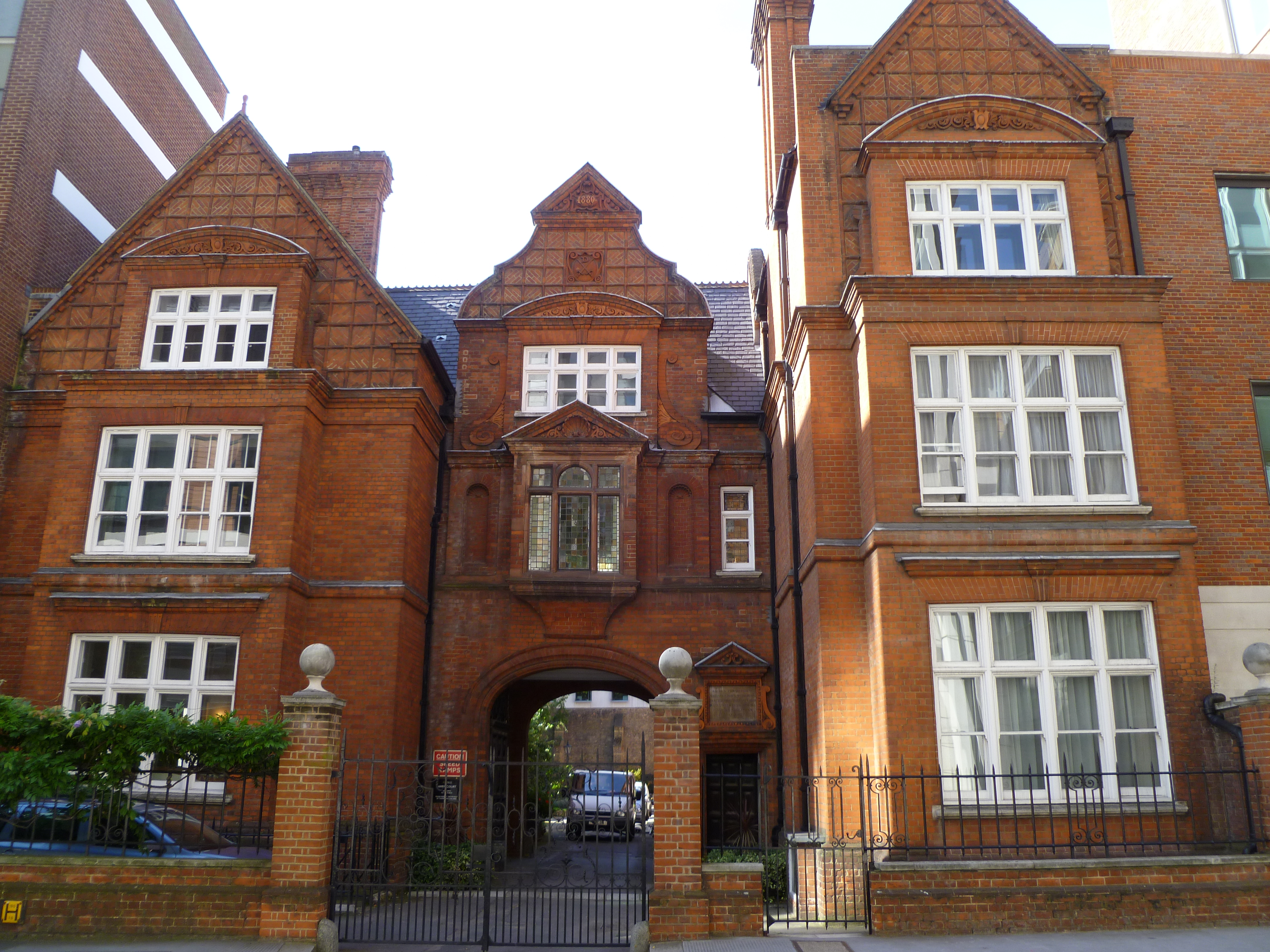
Minor Canonries, Amen Court, City of London, showing the entrance front towards Warwick Lane, 1878–80 by Ewan Christian

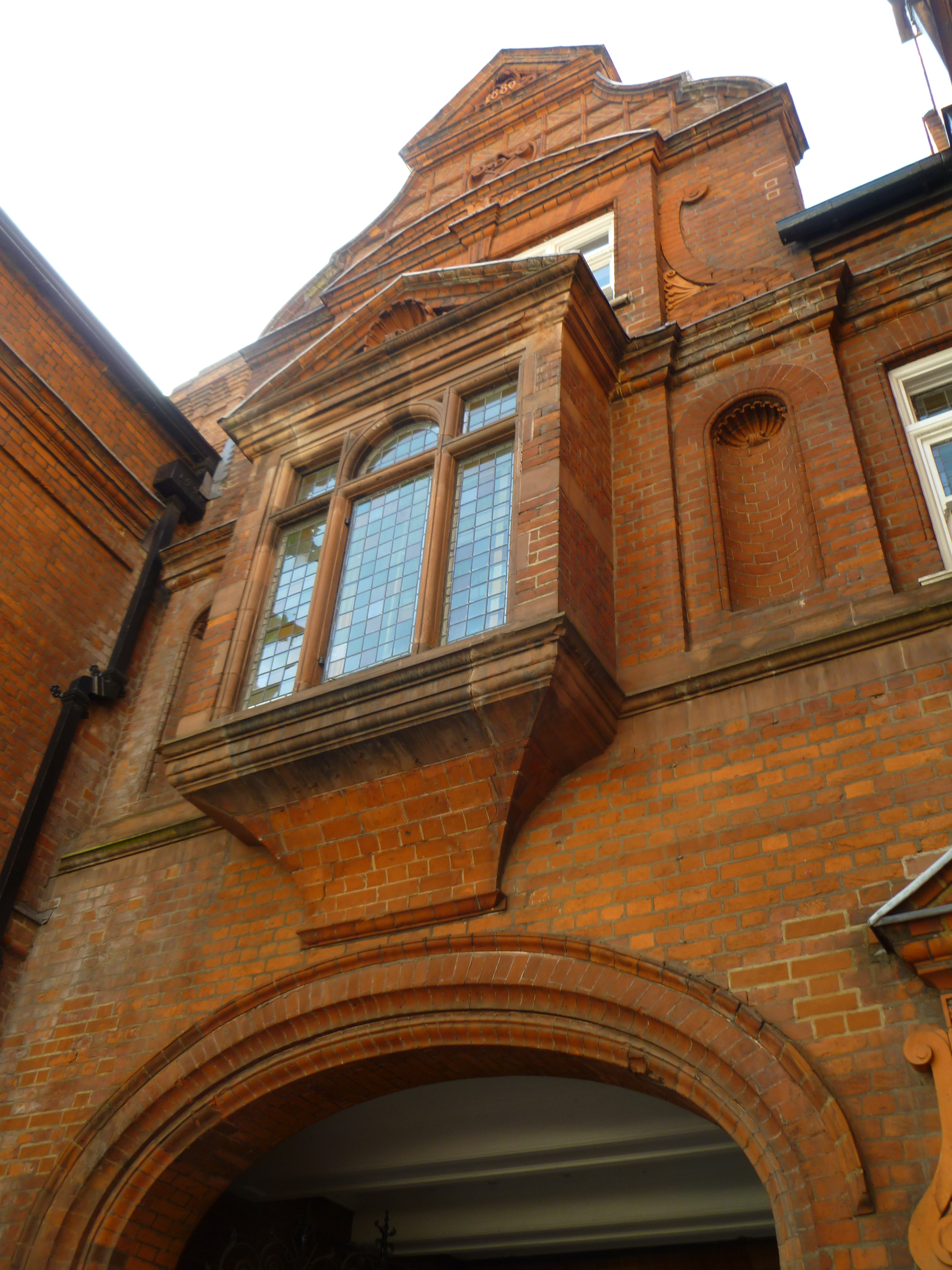
Minor Canonries, Amen Court, City of London, 1878–80 by Ewan Christian, oriel window above the entrance arch

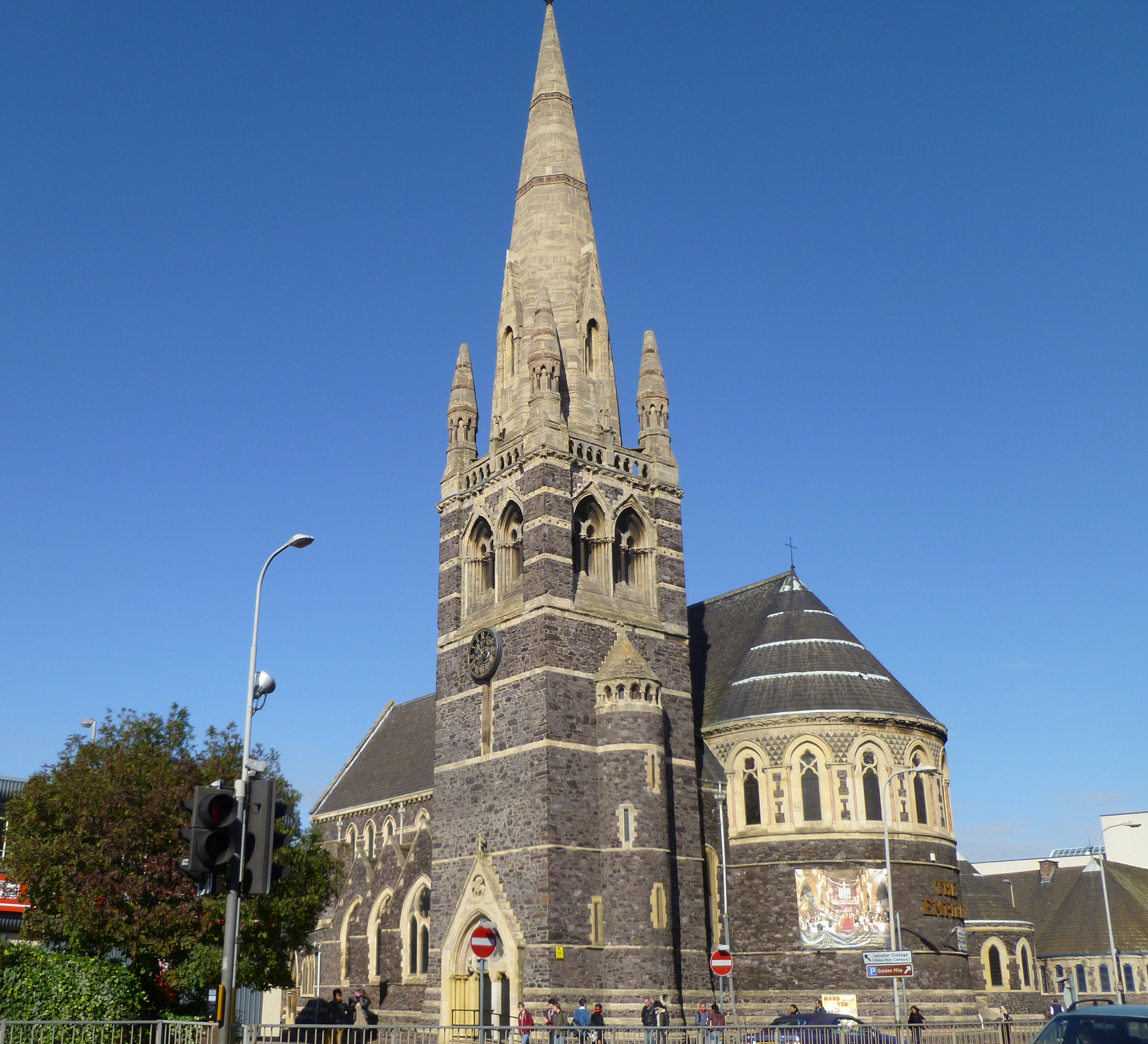
St Mark's Church, Belgrave Gate, Leicester, 1869–72 by Ewan Christian, showing the impressive chancel apse and south-east tower and spire

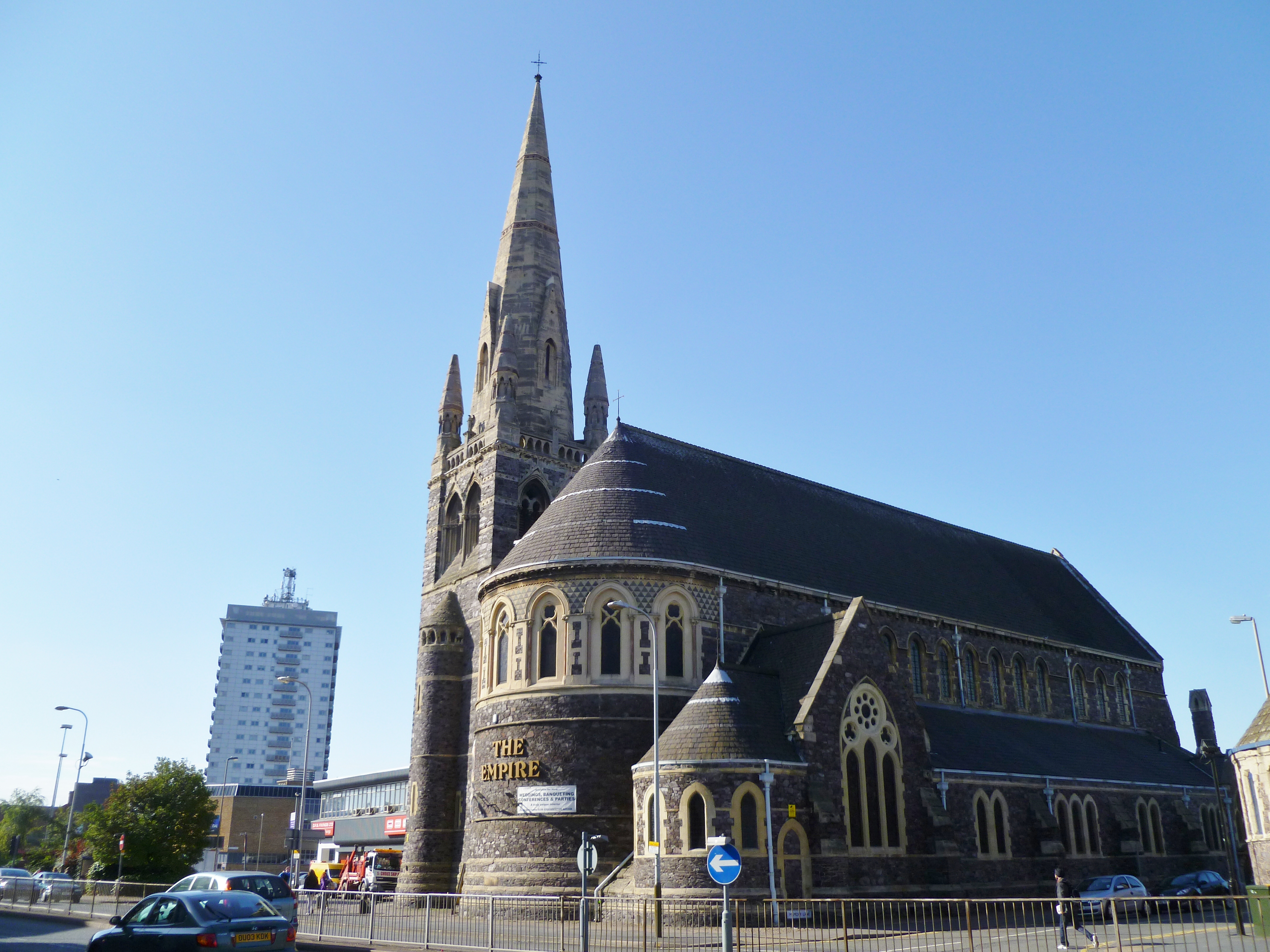
St Mark's Church, Leicester, 1869–72 by Ewan Christian, view of the north side, the one-bay western extension of 1903–4 by E.C. Shearman (1859–1939) can be seen on the right

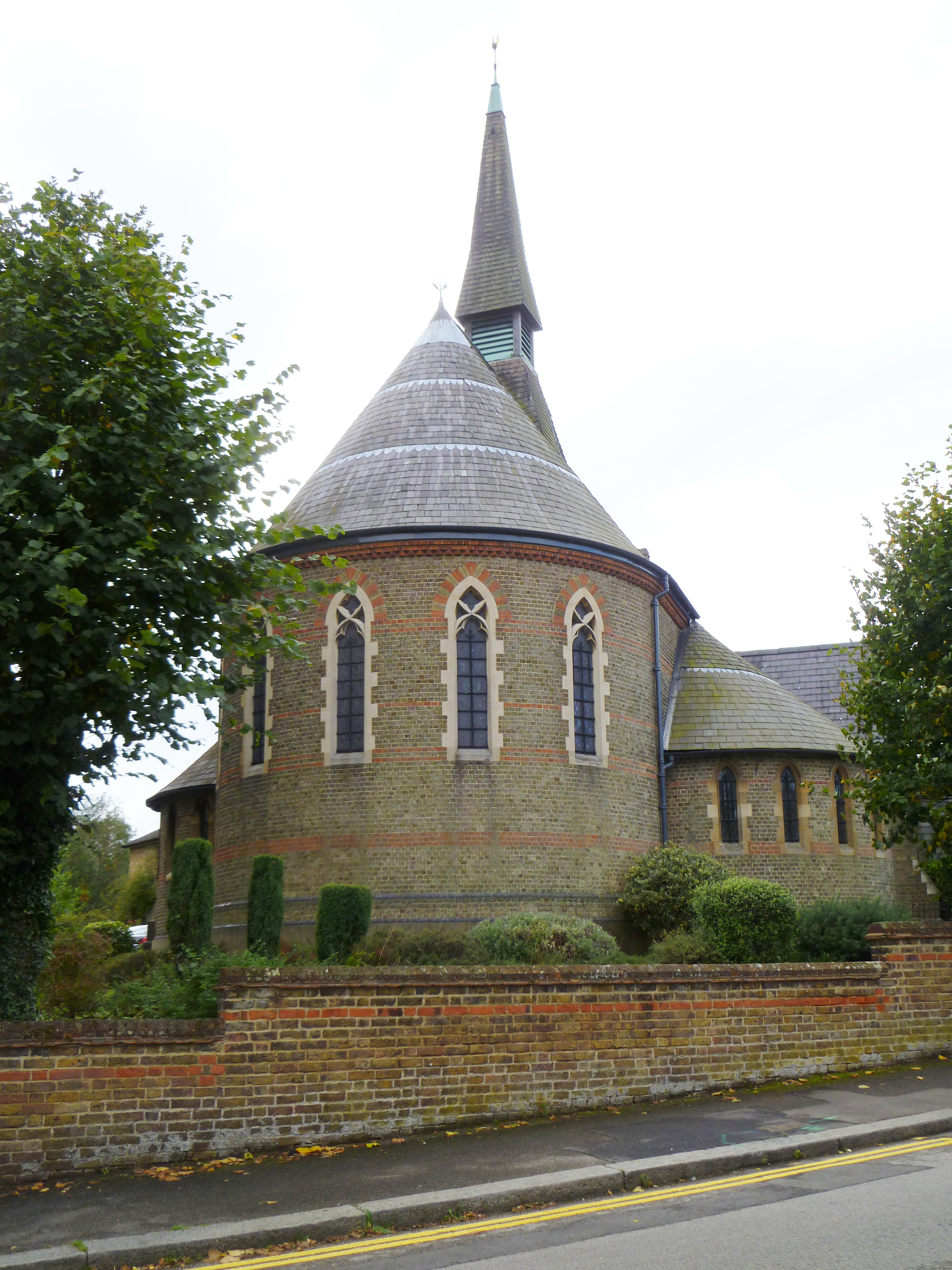
Holy Trinity Church, Lyonsdown Road, New Barnet, London, 1865 by Ewan Christian, showing the strong chancel apse in stock brick with red brick banding

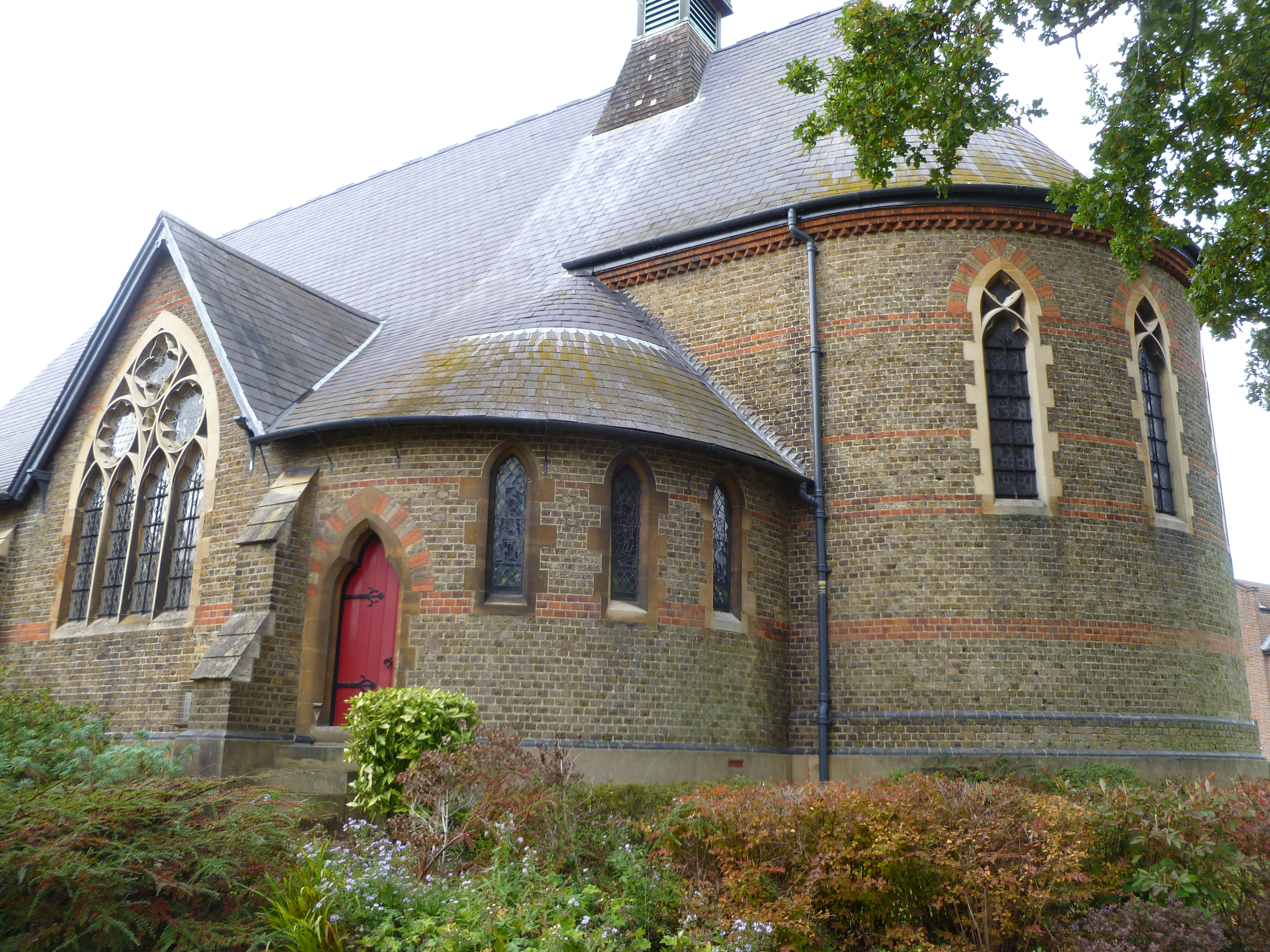
Holy Trinity Church, New Barnet, 1865 by Ewan Christian, view of the south side showing apses

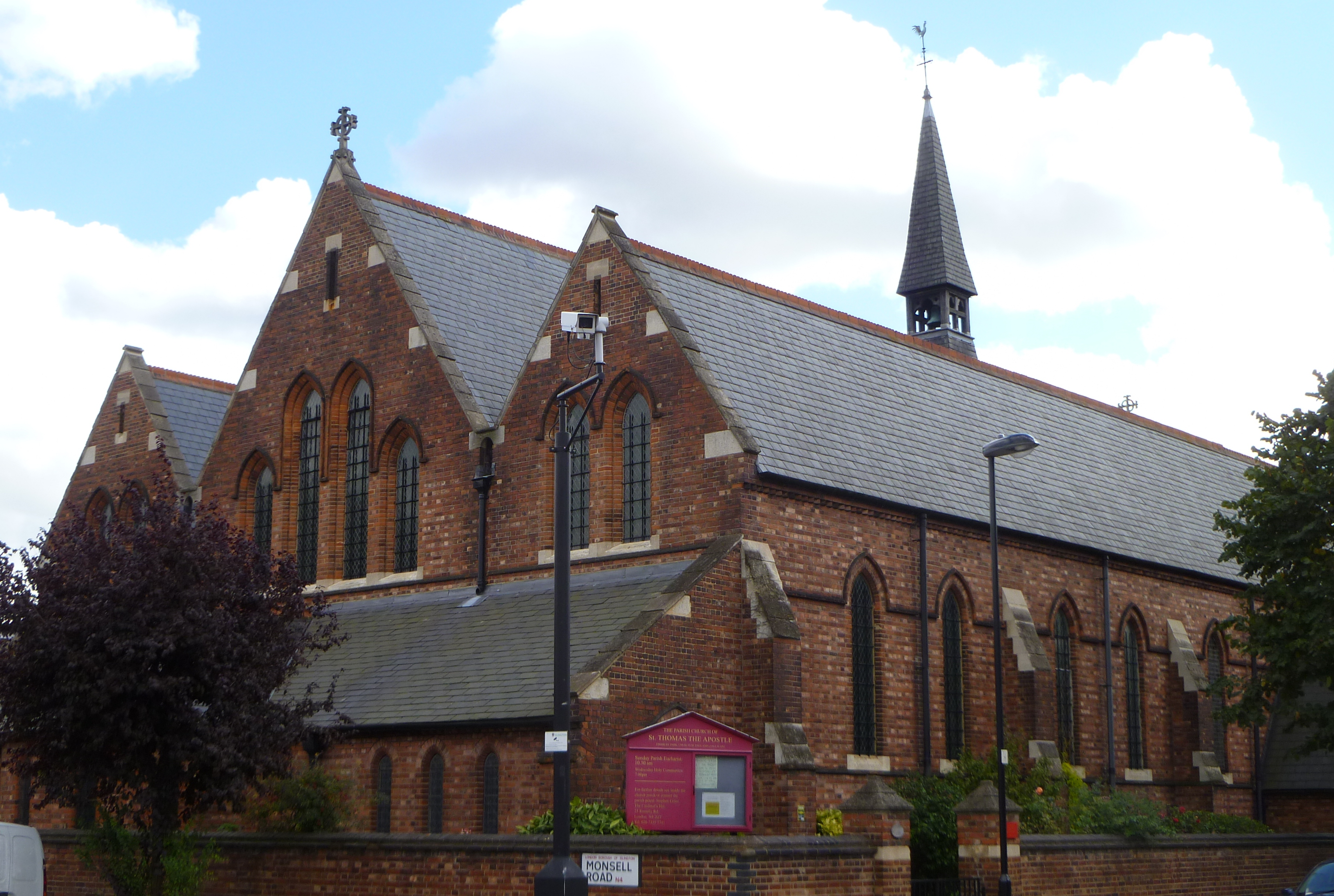
St Thomas's Church, Islington, London, 1888–89 by Ewan Christian, view of west front and south aisle showing Early English style lancets and narthex below the west windows

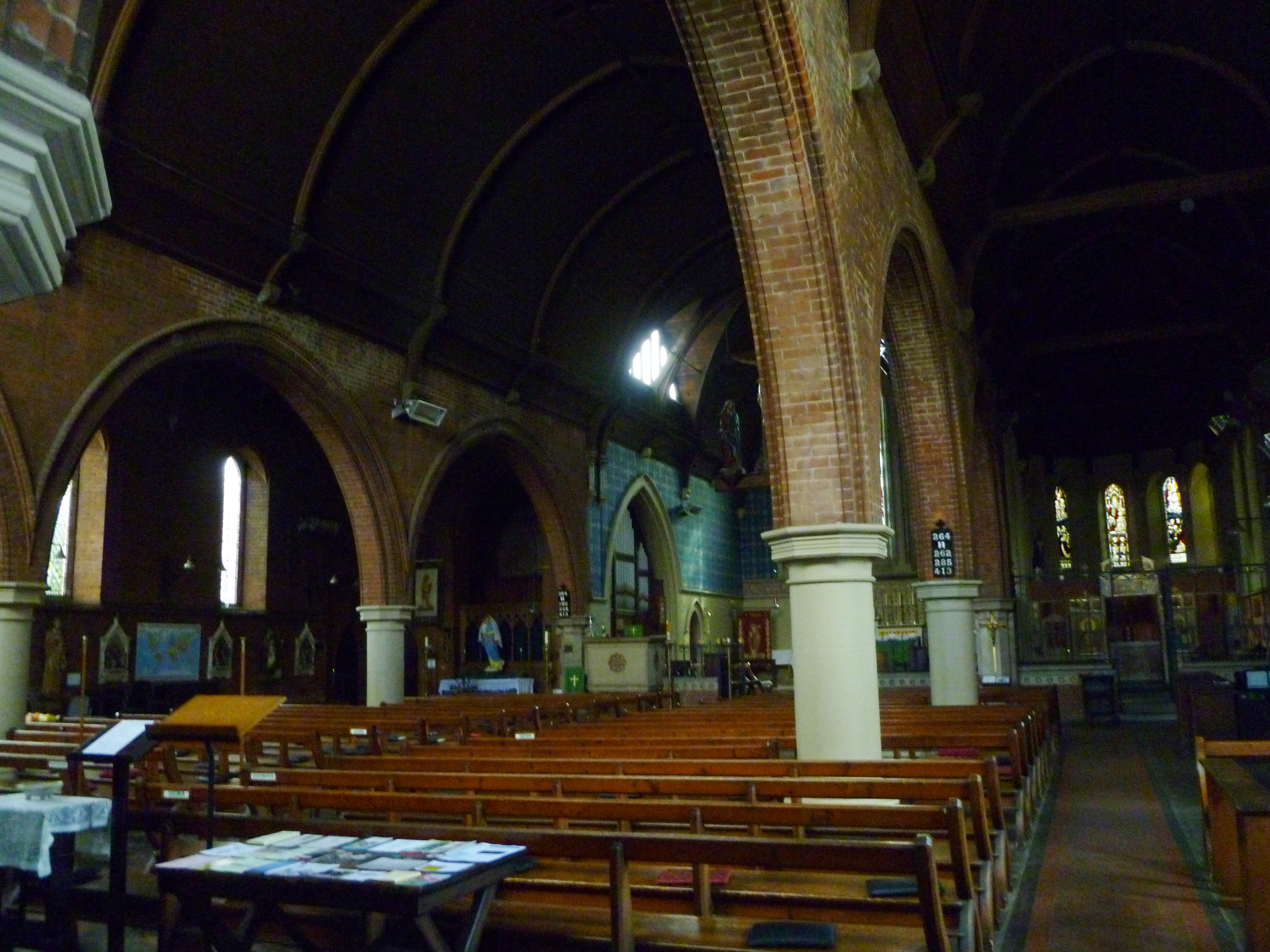
St Thomas's Church, Islington, 1888–89 by Ewan Christian, view of the interior looking east, showing the broad unified space of nave and chancel

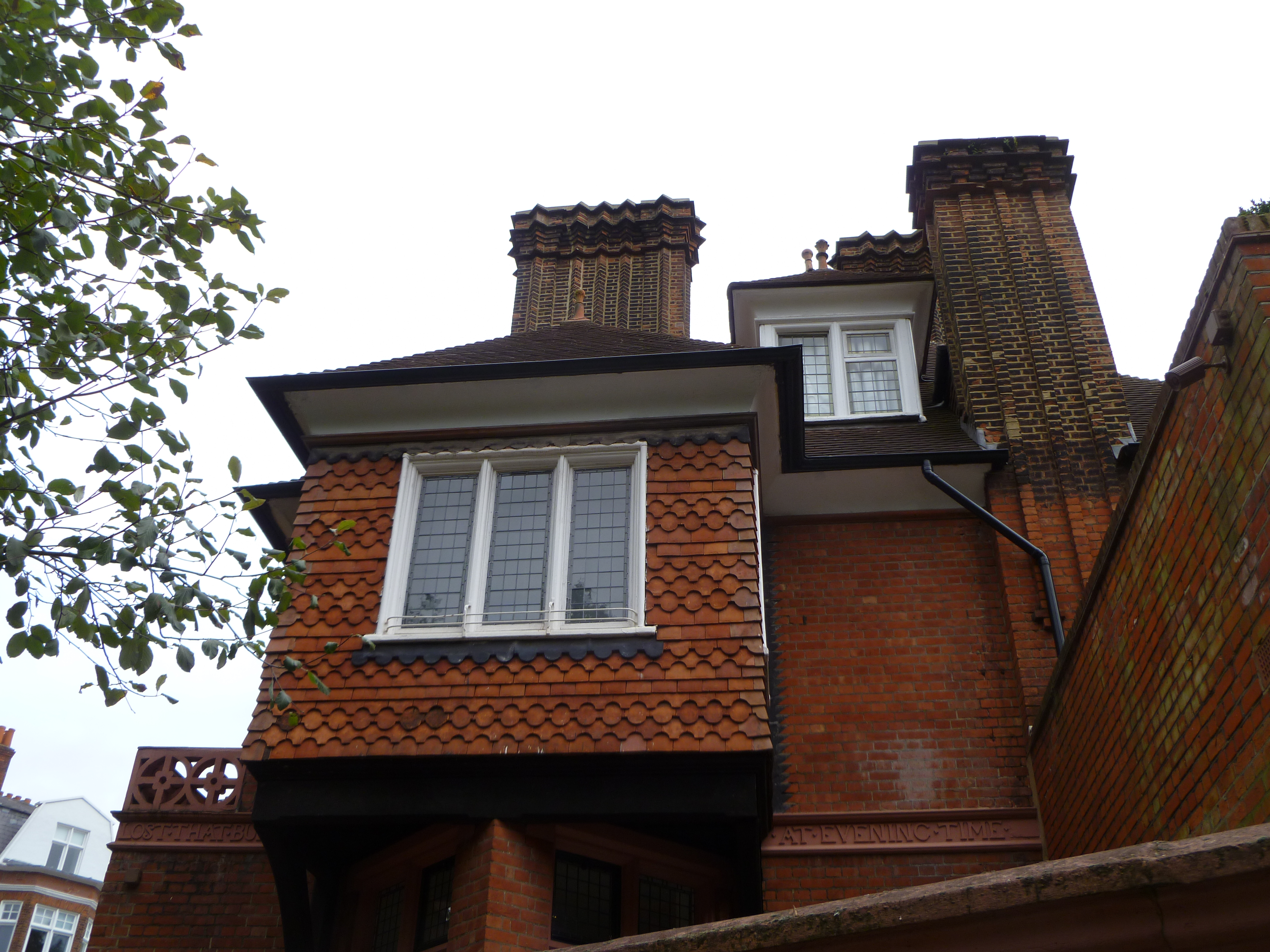
Ewan Christian's house 'Thwaitehead' designed by him and built for himself in 1881–82, showing a projecting bay with tile-hanging

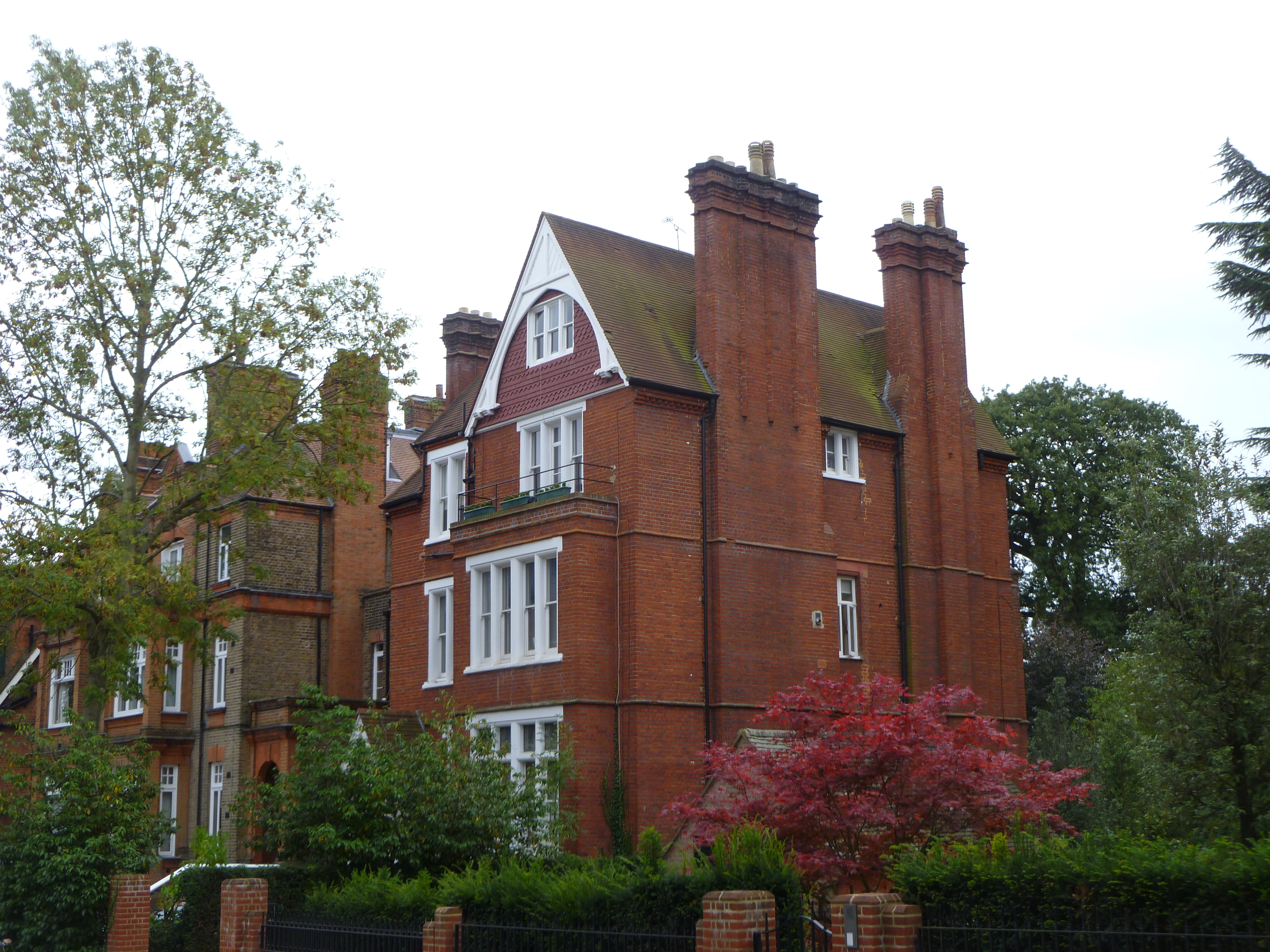
House in East Heath Road, Hampstead, London, 1880s by Ewan Christian, showing Domestic Revival influences

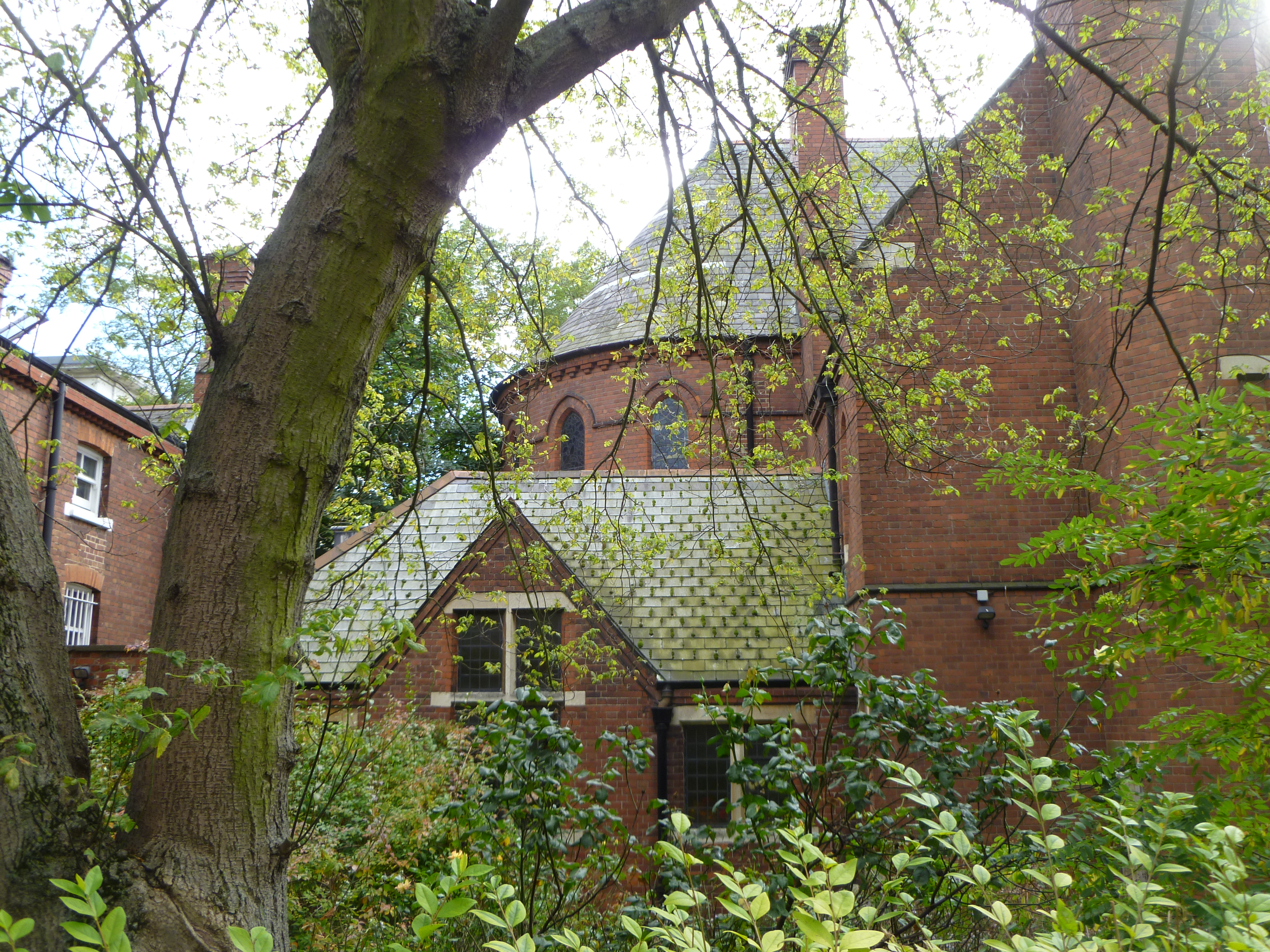
St Olave's Church, Woodberry Down, Manor House, London, London, 1893 by Ewan Christian, showing the noble chancel apse

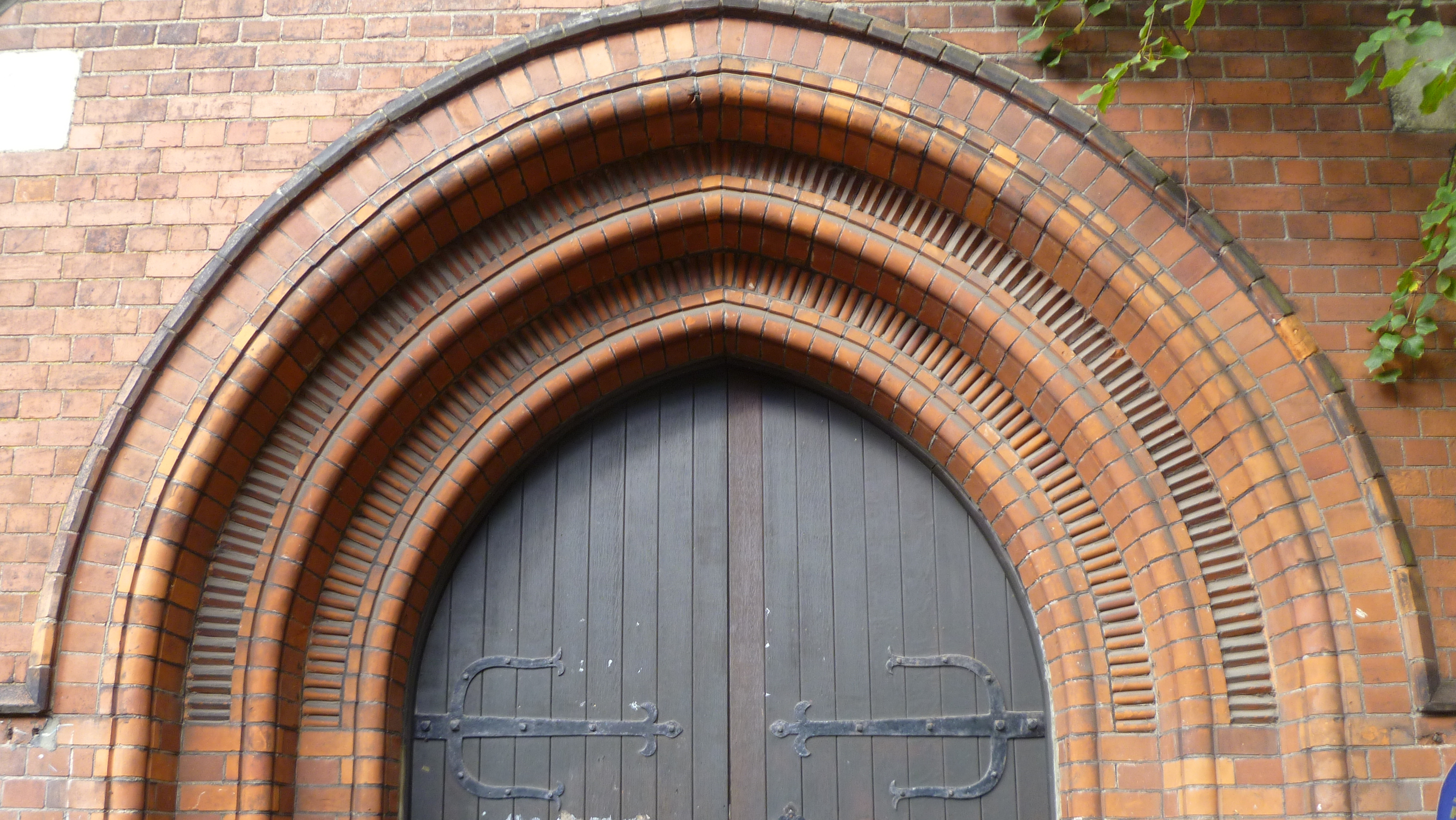
St Olave's Church, Woodberry Down, Manor House, London, 1893 by Ewan Christian, stepped and moulded arch over the south door with ornamental brickwork

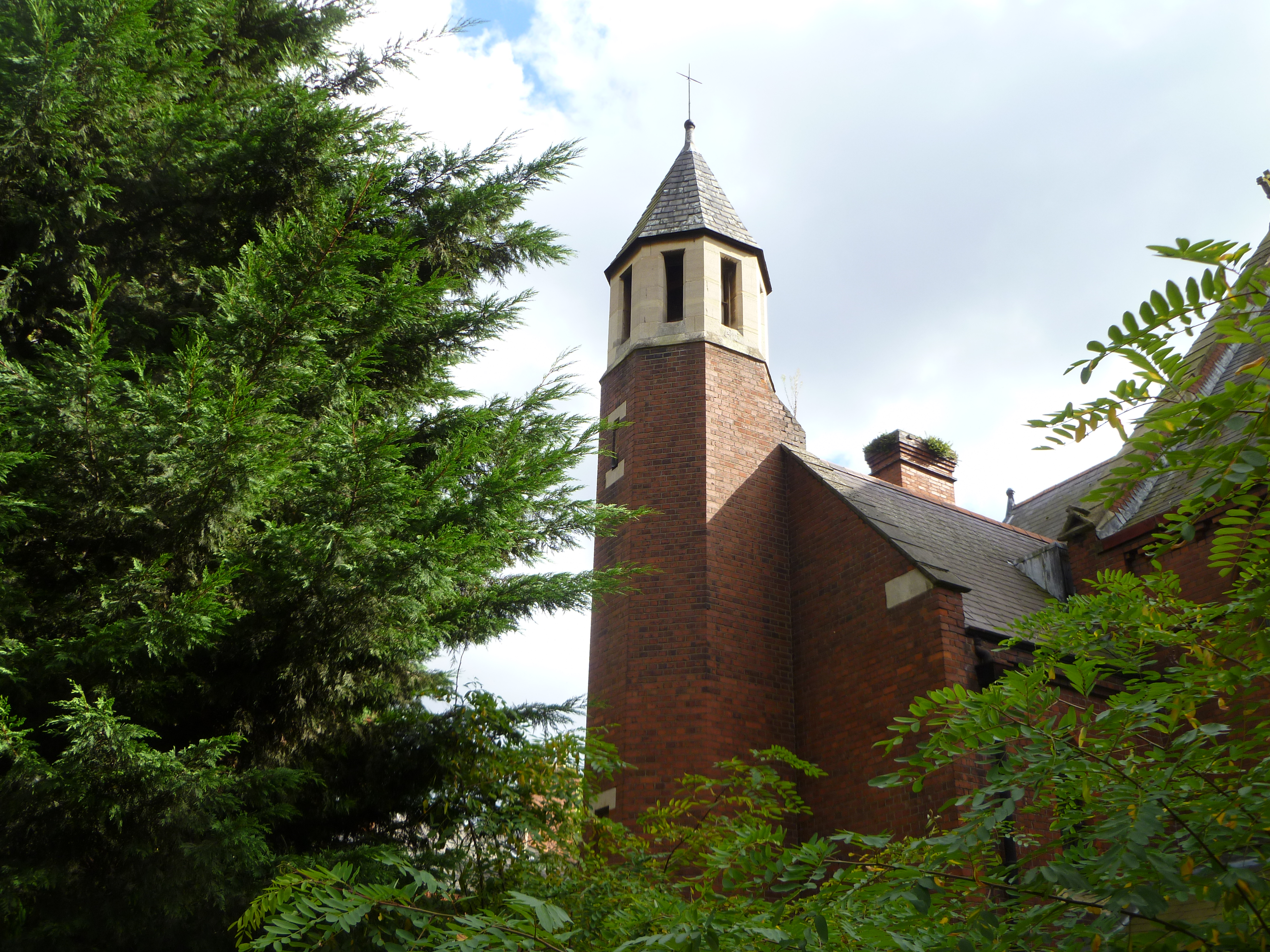
St Olave's Church, Woodberry Down, Manor House, London, 1893 by Ewan Christian, stair-turret with stone conical roof

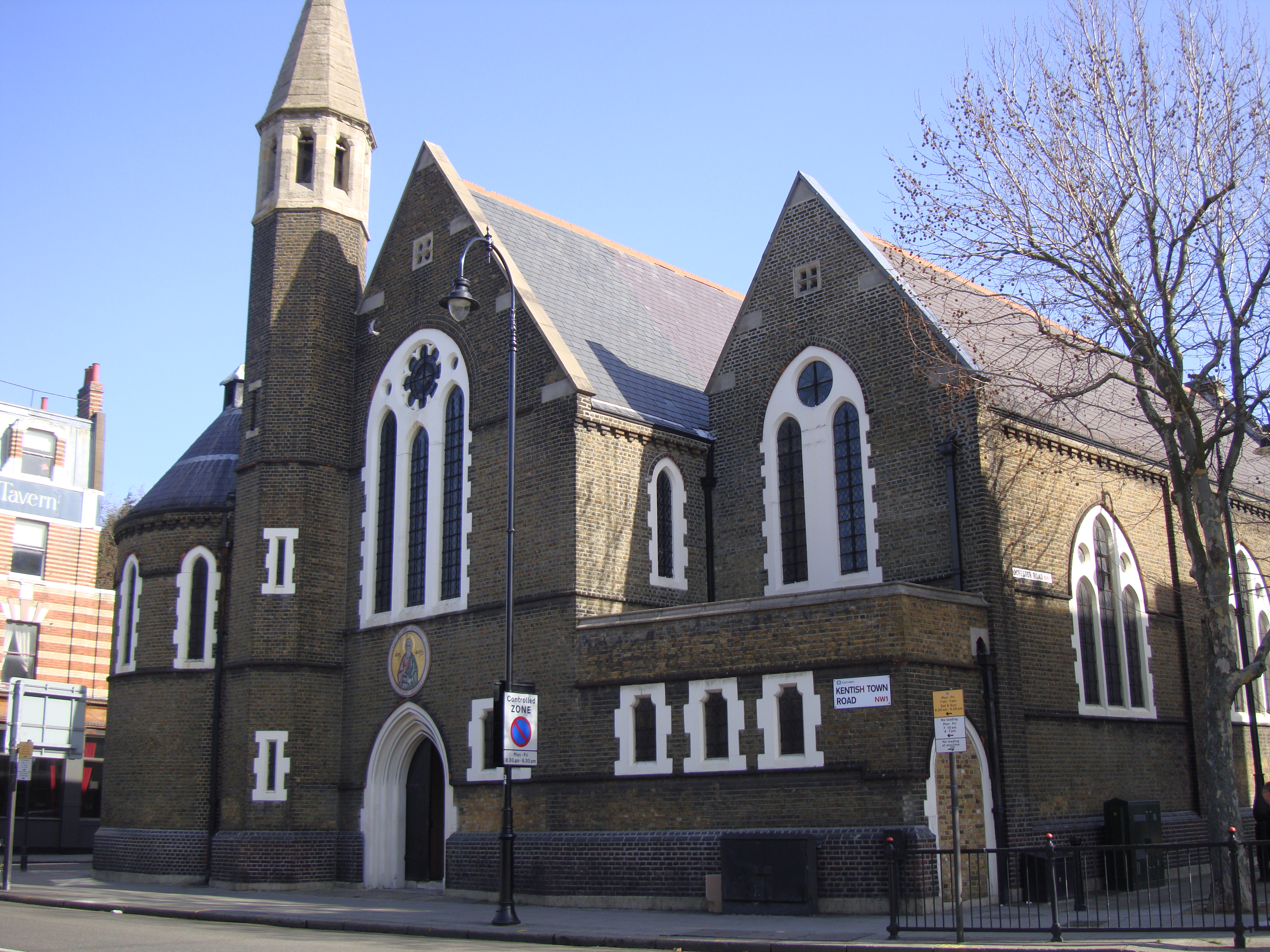
The former St Barnabas Church, Kentish Town Road, Camden in London, 1884–85 by Ewan Christian, now the Greek Orthodox Cathedral of St Andrew, showing the west front with north apse and turret

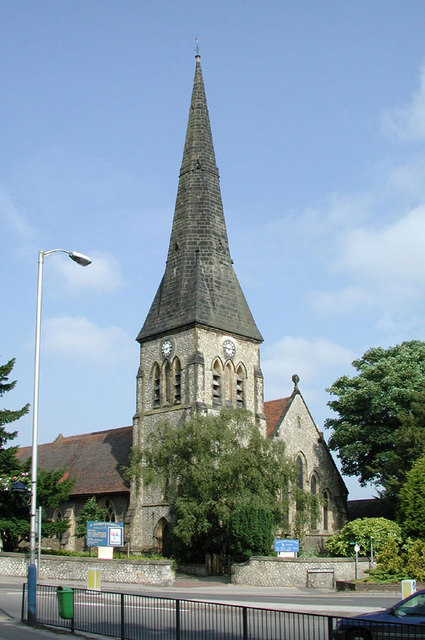
St Stephen's Church, Tonbridge, Kent, 1851–52 by Ewan Christian, tower 1853

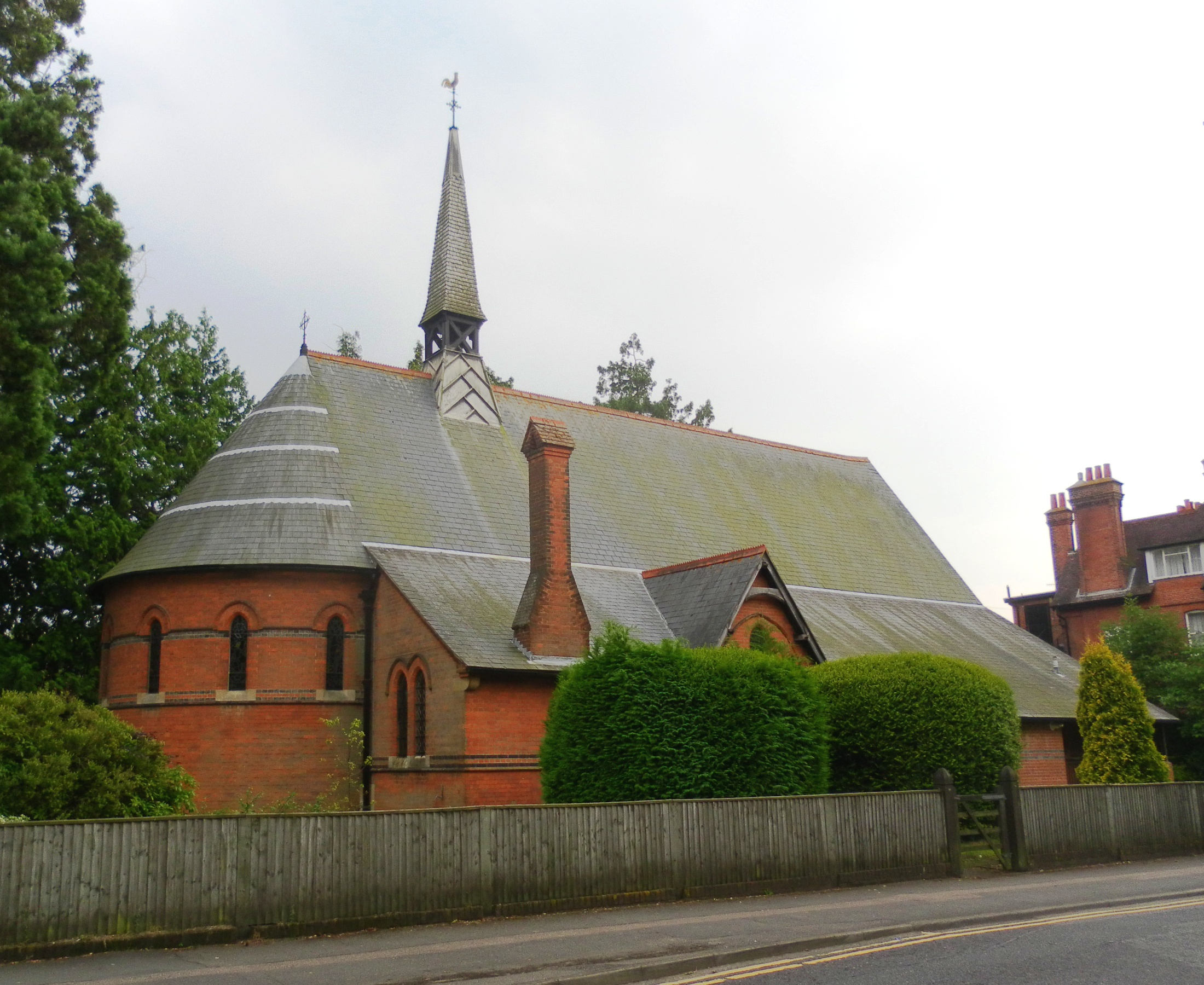
St Saviour's Church, Dry Hill Park Road, Tonbridge, Kent, 1875–76, a typical red brick lancet church by Ewan Christian with deep apse, steep pitched roof and a fleche

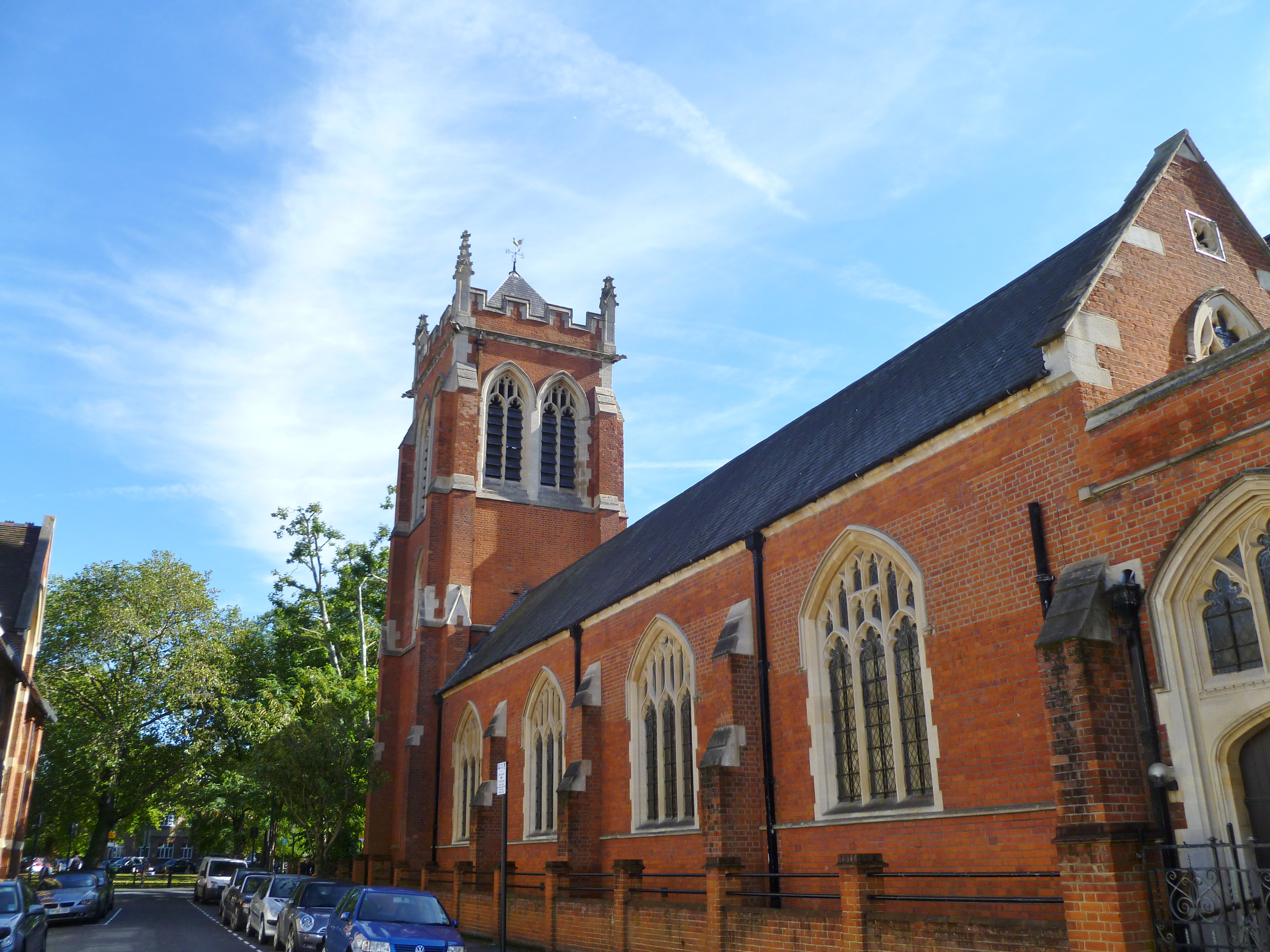
St Dionis, Parsons Green, London, 1884–85 by Ewan Christian, tower completed 1896, showing the north aisle and north-east tower, the church is in the Perpendicular Gothic style - less typical of Christian

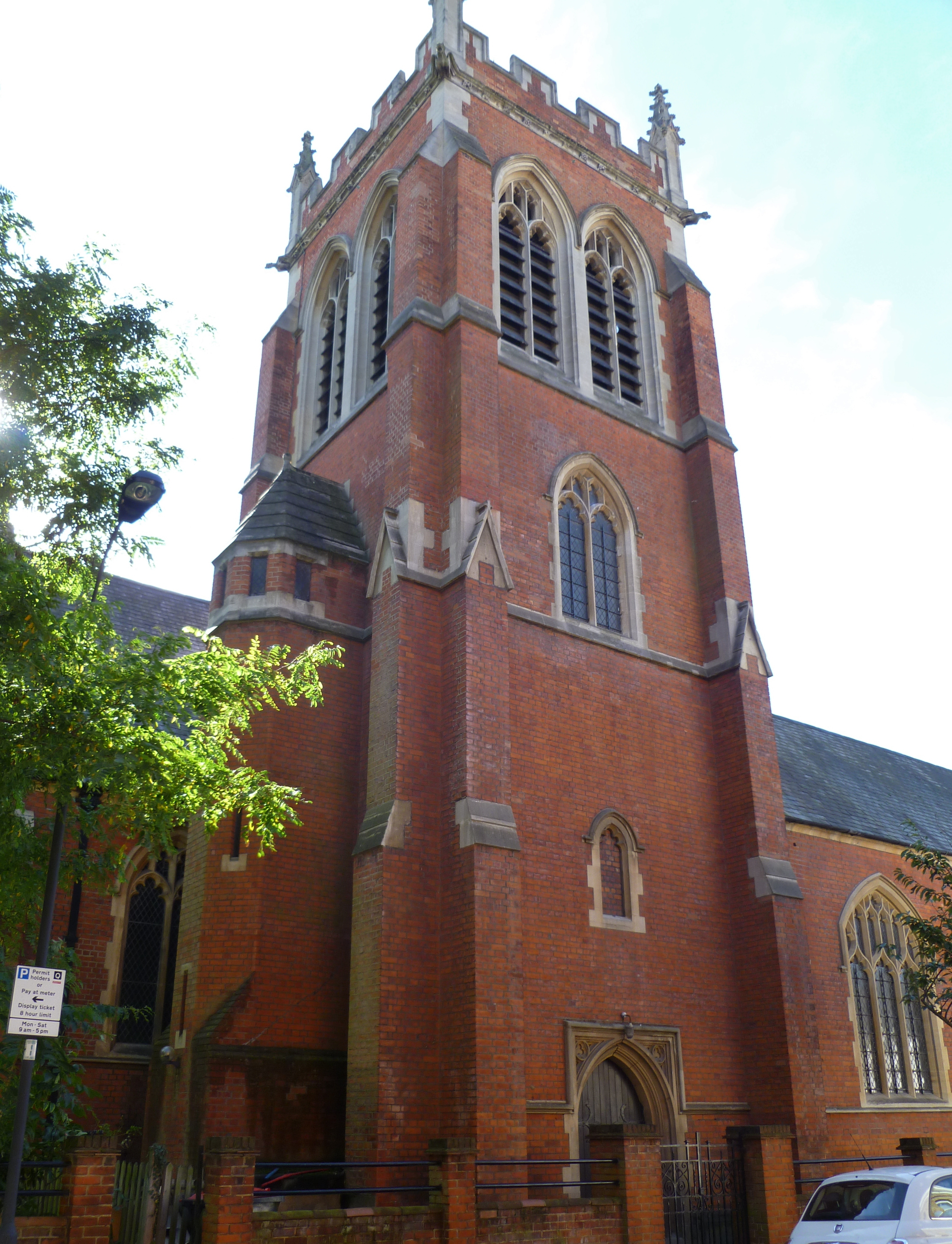
St Dionis, Parsons Green, London, showing the north-east tower of 1896 - one of Christian's last works to be completed but still with his usual stair-turret and pyramidal roof

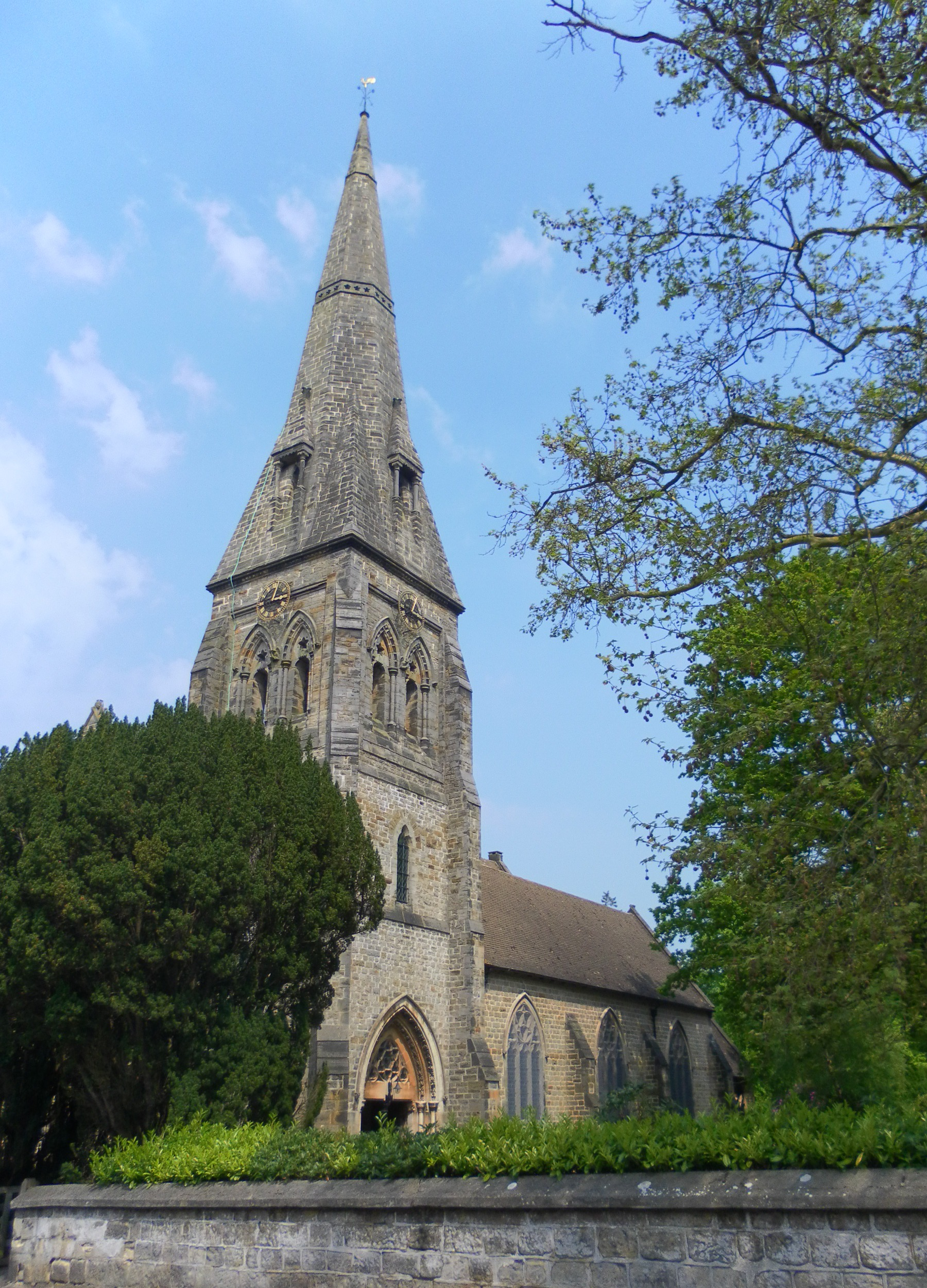
St James's Church, Tunbridge Wells, 1860–62 by Ewan Christian, the windows have rich Geometrical tracery and the south-west steeple also serves as an entrance porch

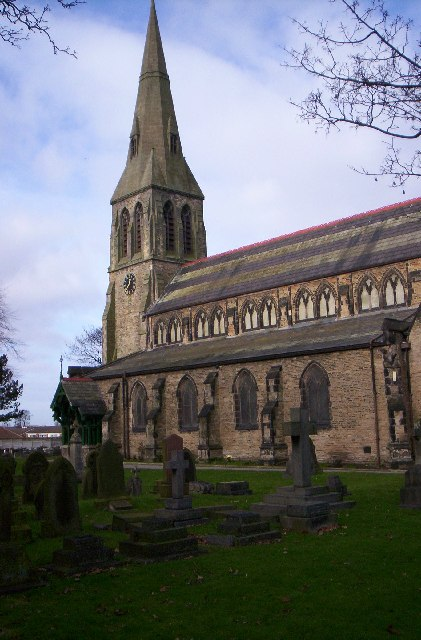
St Bartholomew's Church, Roby, Lancashire, 1875 by Ewan Christian, solidly built in rock-faced stone with ashlar dressings. The church has an impressive west steeple with a broach spire and has a prominent clerestory and an apsed chancel

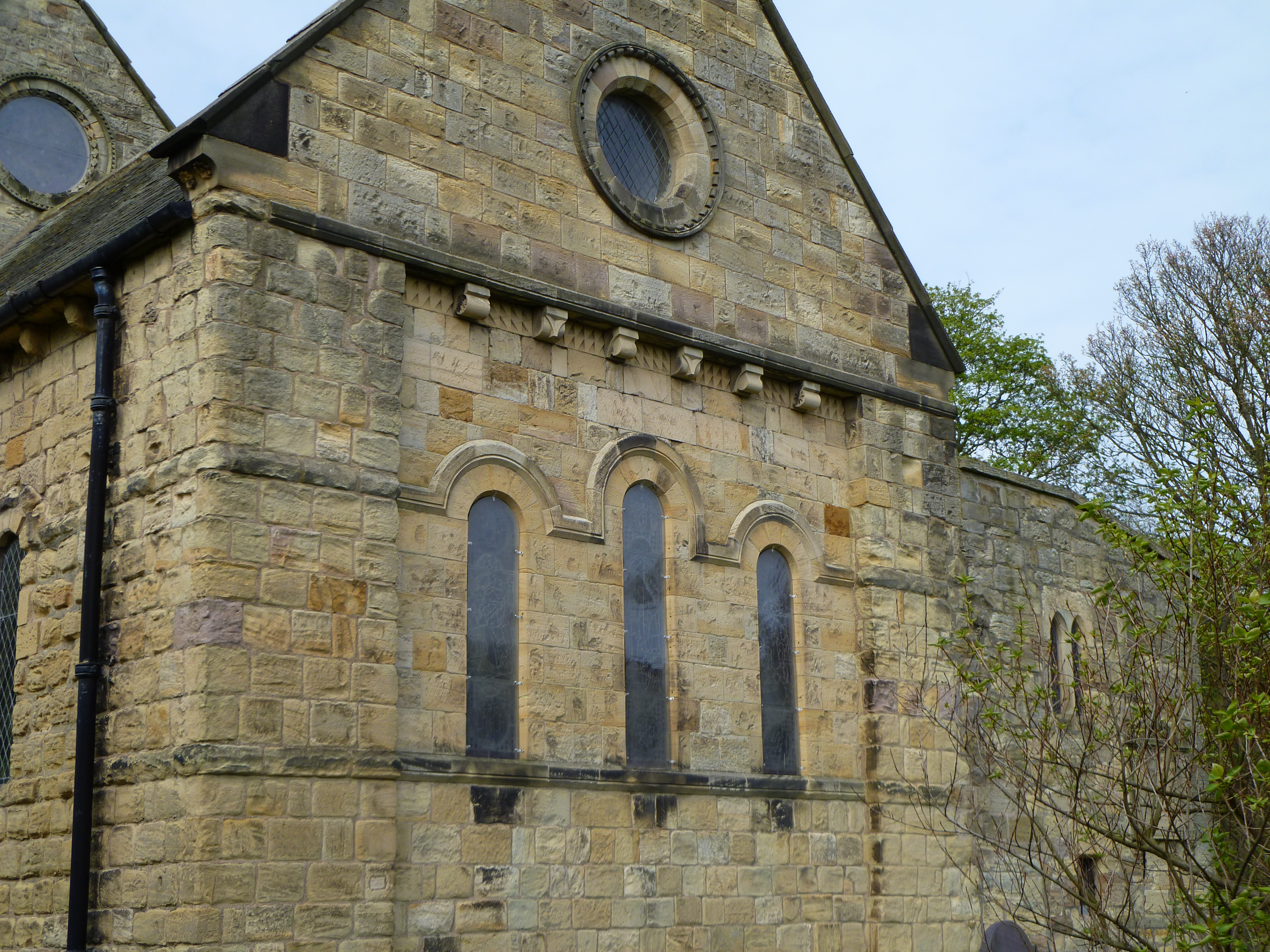
St Laurence's Church, Warkworth, Northumberland, showing the Neo-Norman east windows that Christian provided for the church during his restoration of the chancel in 1860

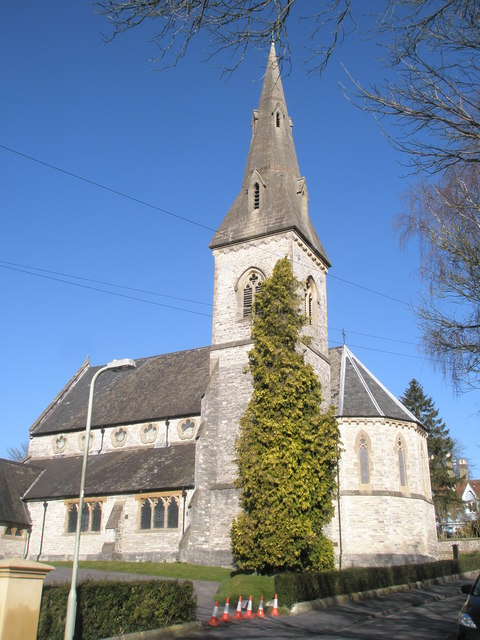
Christ Church, Winchester, Hampshire, 1861 by Ewan Christian, showing the south-east tower and broach spire and the polygonal chancel apse. The church has a striking clerestory with cinquefoil windows

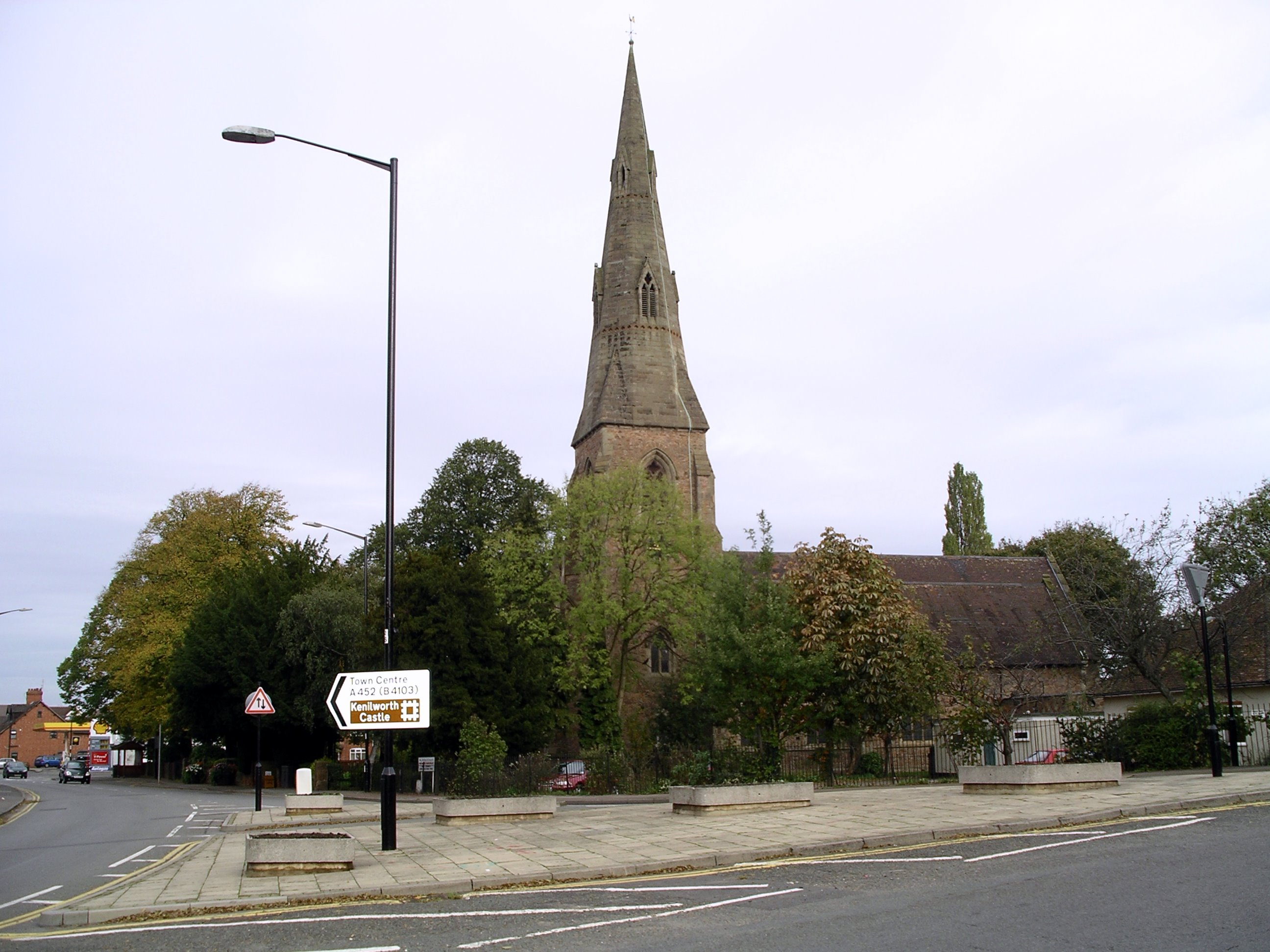
St John's Church, Kenilworth, Warwickshire, 1851–52 by Ewan Christian, showing the fine broach spire

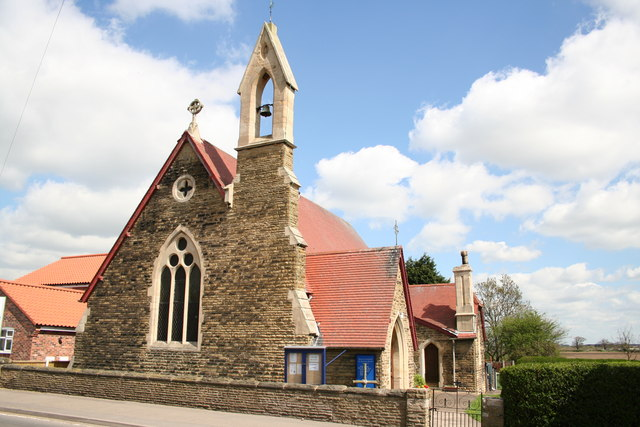
St Barnabas Church, Ranskill, Nottinghamshire, 1878 by Ewan Christian, in stone with a bellcote

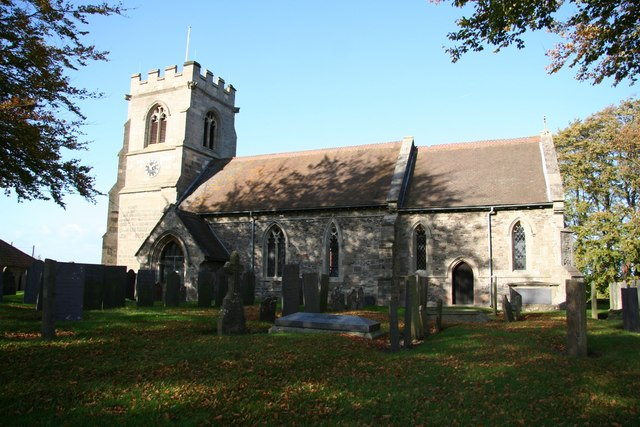
St Helen's Church, Kneeton, Nottinghamshire, mostly of 1879–90 by Ewan Christian except for the medieval west tower

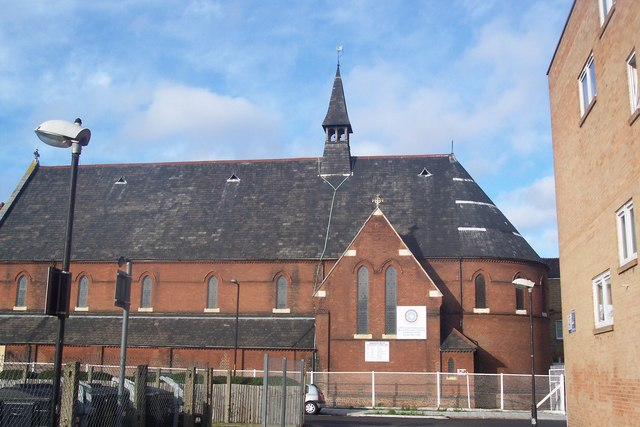
The former Lady Margaret Church, Chatham Street, Southwark, London, built for the St John's College (Cambridge) Mission in 1888–89 by Ewan Christian, now used as the Order of Cherubim and Seraphim Church. Red brick Early English style with typical lancets and apse

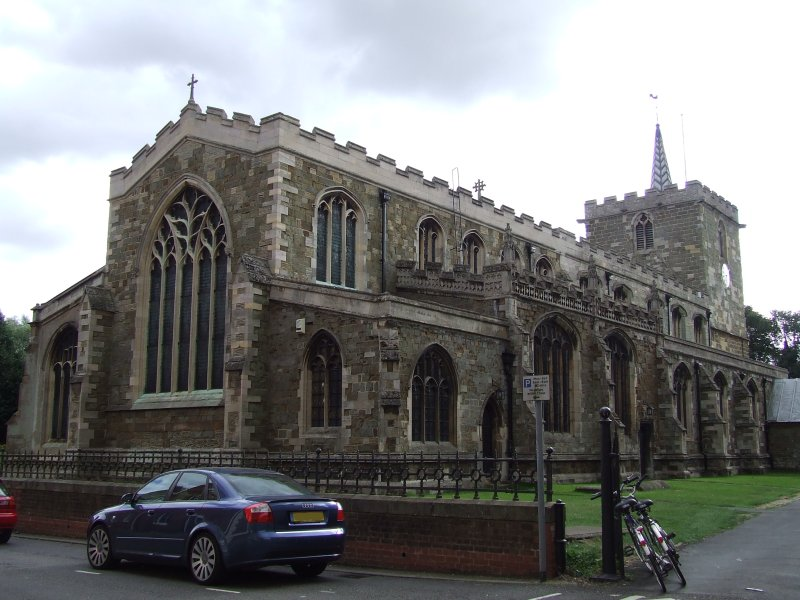
St Mary's Church, Horncastle, Lincolnshire, Ewan Christian gave the church a major restoration in 1859–61 and rebuilt the chancel, its east window, pictured left, was modelled on that at Haltham Church in Lincolnshire

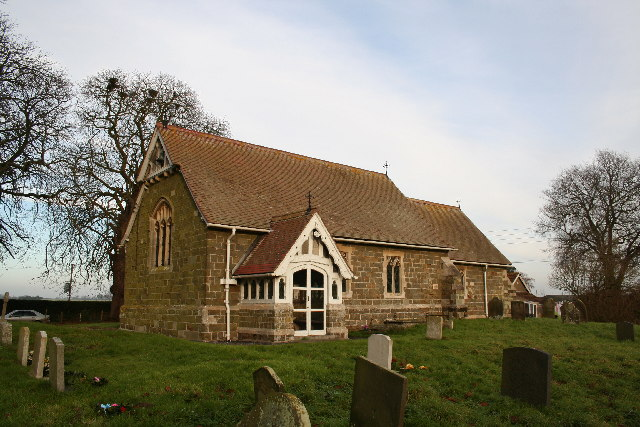
St Wilfrid's Church, Thornton-by-Horncastle, Lincolnshire, general restoration by Ewan Christian in 1890, the timber south porch and timber bell frame in the gable are probably his work

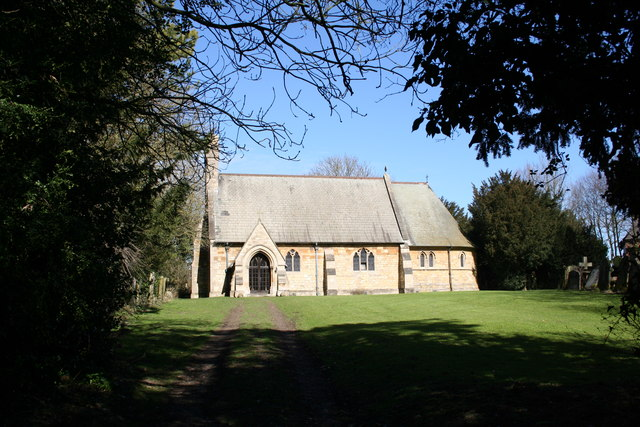
Church of the Holy Ascension, Melton Ross, Lincolnshire, 1867 by Ewan Christian, of stone with a bellcote and broad chancel apse

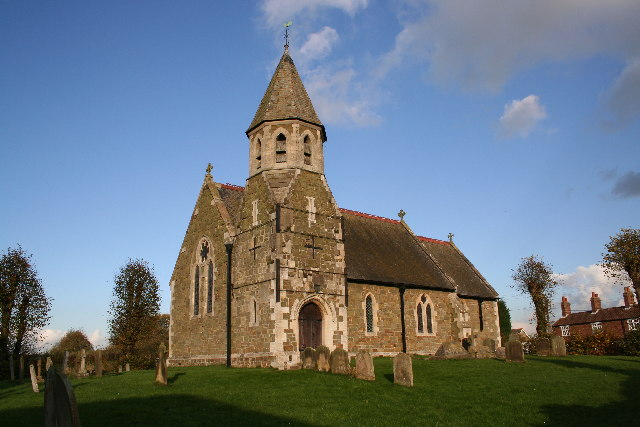
St John the Baptist's Church, High Toynton, Lincolnshire, 1872 by Ewan Christian, showing the unusual south-west porch tower with broaches to the octagonal upper storey and topped by a short spire

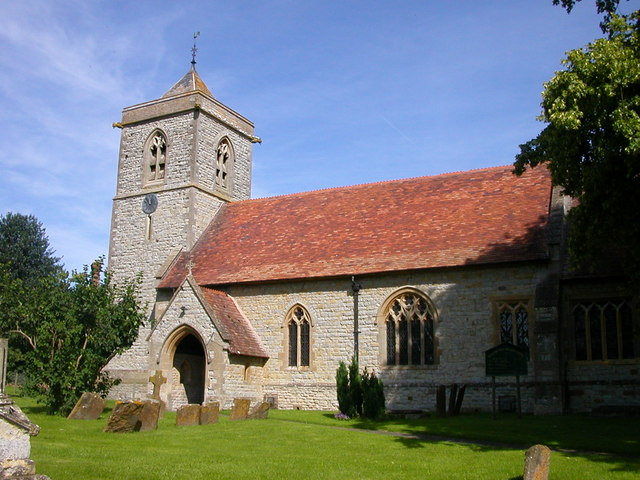
St Michael's Church, Bishop's Itchington, Warwickshire, 1872 by Ewan Christian, stone with Decorated Gothic window tracery and a pyramidal roof to the tower

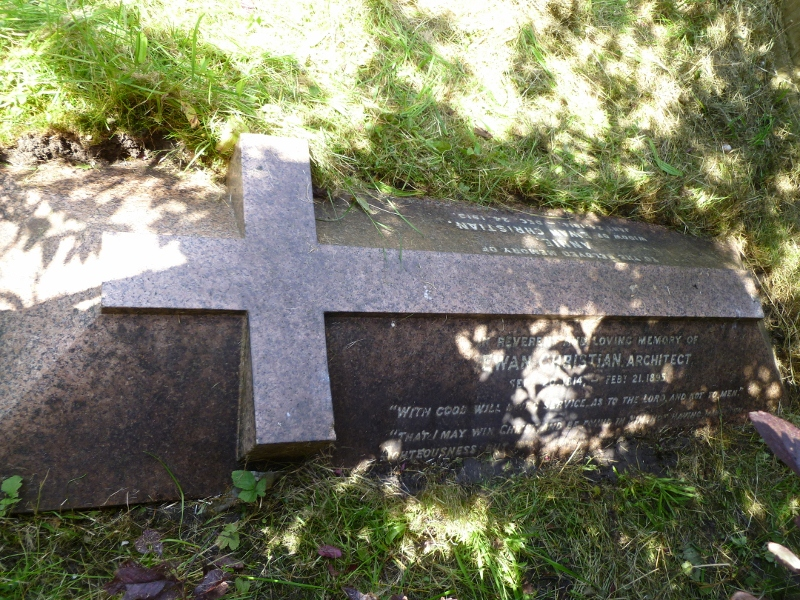
Ewan Christian's grave in Hampstead Cemetery, Fortune Green Road, London; his wife, Annie, who died in 1913 aged 99, is buried with him

== Sources ==
- Adkins, J. Standen (30 September 1911). Journal of the Royal Institute of British Architects vol 18 (article entitled 'Ewan Christian...a memoir'). London: Royal Institute of British Architects. pp. 711–730.
- Anonymous (1978). St. Giles, Skelton: a Brief Guide. Skelton: St. Giles, Skelton.
- Bradley, Simon; Pevsner, Nikolaus (1997). London 1: The City of London. The Buildings of England. Harmondsworth: Penguin Books. pp. 117, 418.
- Bradley, Simon; Pevsner, Nikolaus (2003). London 6: Westminster. The Buildings of England. New Haven and London: Yale University Press. pp. 310–311. ISBN 0-300-09595-3.
- Brodie, Antonia; Felstead, Alison; Franklin, Jonathan; Pinfield, Leslie, eds. (2001). Directory of British Architects 1834–1914, A–K. London & New York: Continuum. p. 372. ISBN 0-8264-5513-1.
- Brooke, Harold (1997). Closed for Business: Ewan Christian's Restoration of Southwell Minster 1848–1888. Southwell: Southwell Minster. pp. 74–78.
- Brown, Roderick (1985). The Architectural Outsiders. Waterstone. ISBN 978-0-947752-04-0.
- Buchanan, Brian; Hulme, Graham (1996). St Mark's Church, Leicester: an architectural and historical study. Leicester: Leicester Group of the Victorian Society. ISBN 0952833107.
- Charles, E.R. (introduction) (1896). Ewan Christian, Architect. Cambridge: Cambridge University Press.
- Cherry, Bridget; Pevsner, Nikolaus (1983). London 2: South. The Buildings of England. Harmondsworth: Penguin Books. ISBN 0-14-071047-7.
- Cherry, Bridget; Pevsner, Nikolaus (1991). London 3: North West. The Buildings of England. Harmondsworth: Penguin Books.
- Cherry, Bridget; Pevsner, Nikolaus (2002). London 4: North. The Buildings of England. New Haven and London: Yale University Press. ISBN 0-300-09653-4.
- Cherry, Bridget; Pevsner, Nikolaus (2004). Devon. The Buildings of England. New Haven and London: Yale University Press. ISBN 0-300-09596-1.
- Cherry, Bridget; O'Brien, Charles; Pevsner, Nikolaus (2005). London 5: East. The Buildings of England. New Haven and London: Yale University Press. ISBN 9780300107012.
- Cole, David (1980). The Work of Sir Gilbert Scott. London: Architectural Press.
- Clark, G. Kitson (1965). The Making of Victorian England (paperback ed.). London: Methuen. pp. 154–157, 191–195. ISBN 978-0-416-69320-1.
- Colvin, Howard (1995). A Biographical Dictionary of British Architects 1600–1840 (3rd ed.). New Haven and London: Yale University Press. pp. 790–791. ISBN 0-300-07207-4.
- Dale, Antony (1989). Brighton Churches. London: Routledge. ISBN 0-415-00863-8.
- Freeman, Jennifer M. (1990). W.D. Caroe: his architectural achievement. Manchester: Manchester University Press. pp. 24–25.
- Harper, Roger H. (1983). Victorian Architectural Competitions. London: Mansell.
- Howell, Peter; Sutton, Ian, eds. (1989). The Faber Guide to Victorian Churches. London: Faber and Faber.
- Hulme, Graham; Buchanan, Brian; Powell, Kenneth (2000). The National Portrait Gallery: An Architectural History. London: National Portrait Gallery. ISBN 1-85514-293-7.
- Matthew, H.C.G.; Harrison, Brian, eds. (2004). Oxford Dictionary of National Biography (article entitled 'Ewan Christian (1814–1895), architect' by Martin Cherry). Oxford: Oxford University Press. ISBN 9780198614111.
- Nairn, Ian; Pevsner, Nikolaus (1965). Sussex. The Buildings of England. Harmondsworth: Penguin Books.
- Newman, John; Pevsner, Nikolaus (1972). Dorset. The Buildings of England. Harmondsworth: Penguin Books. ISBN 0-14-071044-2.
- Newman, John; Pevsner, Nikolaus (2012). Kent: West and the Weald. The Buildings of England. New Haven and London: Yale University Press.
- Norwich, John Julius (1985). The Architecture of Southern England. London: Macmillan. ISBN 0-333-22037-4.
- Parry, Linda, ed. (1996). William Morris. London: Philip Wilson Publishers in association with the Victoria and Albert Museum.
- Pevsner, Nikolaus (1963). Herefordshire. The Buildings of England. Harmondsworth: Penguin Books. pp. 102, 121.
- Pevsner, Nikolaus (1966). Yorkshire: The North Riding. The Buildings of England. Harmondsworth: Penguin Books. p. 320.
- Pevsner, Nikolaus (1968a). Bedfordshire and the County of Huntingdon and Peterborough. The Buildings of England. Harmondsworth: Penguin Books. pp. 62, 204n, 326. ISBN 978-0-14-071034-2.
- Pevsner, Nikolaus (1968b). Worcestershire. The Buildings of England. Harmondsworth: Penguin Books. pp. 200, 227, 319.
- Pevsner, Nikolaus (1972). Yorkshire: York & the East Riding. The Buildings of England. Harmondsworth: Penguin Books. pp. 44, 352. ISBN 978-0-14-071043-4.
- Pevsner, Nikolaus (1974). Staffordshire. The Buildings of England. Harmondsworth: Penguin Books.
- Pevsner, Nikolaus; Cherry, Bridget (revision) (1973) [1961]. Northamptonshire. The Buildings of England. Harmondsworth: Penguin Books. p. 75. ISBN 0-14-071022-1.
- Pevsner, Nikolaus; Cherry, Bridget (revision) (1975) [1963]. Wiltshire. The Buildings of England. Harmondsworth: Penguin Books. p. 154. ISBN 0-14-071026-4.
- Pevsner, Nikolaus; Harris, John; Antram, Nicholas (revision) (2002) [1964]. Lincolnshire. The Buildings of England. New Haven and London: Yale University Press. pp. 307, 387. ISBN 0-300-09620-8.
- Pevsner, Nikolaus; Lloyd, David (2002) [1967]. Hampshire and the Isle of Wight. The Buildings of England. New Haven and London: Yale University Press.
- Pevsner, Nikolaus; Richmond, Ian; Grundy, John et al. (revision) (2002) [1957]. Northumberland. The Buildings of England. New Haven and London: Yale University Press. ISBN 0-300-09638-0.
- Pevsner, Nikolaus; Wedgwood, Alexandra (1966). Warwickshire. The Buildings of England. Harmondsworth: Penguin Books.
- Pevsner, Nikolaus; Williamson, Elizabeth (1978) [1953]. Derbyshire. The Buildings of England. Harmondsworth: Penguin Books. pp. 101–102. ISBN 0-14-071008-6.
- Pevsner, Nikolaus; Williamson, Elizabeth (revision) (1979) [1951]. Nottinghamshire. The Buildings of England. Harmondsworth: Penguin Books.
- Pevsner, Nikolaus; Williamson, Elizabeth (revision) (1984) [1960]. Leicestershire and Rutland. The Buildings of England. Harmondsworth: Penguin Books.
- Pollard, Richard; Pevsner, Nikolaus (2006). Lancashire: Liverpool and the South-West. The Buildings of England. New Haven and London: Yale University Press.
- Quiney, Anthony (1979). John Loughborough Pearson. New Haven and London: Yale University Press. pp. 84–85. ISBN 0-300-02253-0.
- Sherwood, Jennifer; Pevsner, Nikolaus (1974). Oxfordshire. The Buildings of England. Harmondsworth: Penguin Books. pp. 769–770. ISBN 0-14-071045-0.
- Thompson, Paul (1971). William Butterfield. London: Routledge & Kegan Paul.
- Verey, David (1970). Gloucestershire: The Cotswolds. The Buildings of England. Harmondsworth: Penguin Books. ISBN 0-14-071040-X.
- Verey, David; Pevsner, Nikolaus (1976) [1970]. Gloucestershire: The Vale and the Forest of Dean. The Buildings of England. Harmondsworth: Penguin Books. p. 130. ISBN 0-14-071041-8.
