= British church =

British church may refer to:

== Christian denomination ==
- Celtic Christianity
- Christianity in the United Kingdom
  - Church of England
- Christianity in Ireland
- Ancient British Church, a former denomination, allegedly created in the 19th century
- Catholicate of the West, also called Orthodox Church of the British Isles
- British Orthodox Church
- Ancient British Church in North America

== Building ==
- Church architecture in England
- English church monuments
- Church architecture in Scotland

== See also ==
- Neo-Celtic Christianity
- Celtic Rite
  - Celtic mass
- Religion in the United Kingdom
- Religion in Ireland
- English church (disambiguation)
- Irish church (disambiguation)
- Scottish church (disambiguation)
