= English church (disambiguation) =

The English church or Church of England is a Christian church which is the established church of England.

English church or Church of England may also refer to:

- Catholic Church in England and Wales, a component of the worldwide Catholic Church
- Free Church of England, an English Anglican denomination
- English Church (Bad Homburg), a former Church of England building in Hesse, Germany
- English Church, Balestrand, St. Olaf's Church, Balestrand in Norway
- English Church, Stockholm, St Peter and St Sigfrid's Church in Sweden
- English church at Amsterdam, English Reformed Church, Amsterdam, Netherlands
- Church architecture in England
- English church monuments

== See also ==
- Christianity in England
- English Church Union, name from 1869 to 1933 of predecessor body of The Church Union
- English Church and Schoolhouse, name used in NHRP listing for New Hempstead Presbyterian Church, New York, United States
- English Lutheran Church, a church in Kansas, United States
- First English Lutheran Church (disambiguation)
- British church (disambiguation)
