= First English Lutheran Church =

First English Lutheran Church may refer to:

- First English Lutheran Church (Syracuse, New York), listed on the NRHP in New York
- First English Lutheran Church (Mansfield, Ohio), listed on the NRHP in Ohio
- First English Lutheran Church (New Richmond, Wisconsin), listed on the NRHP in Wisconsin
