= Scottish churches =

Scottish churches may refer to:

- Church architecture in Scotland
- Religion in Scotland
