= Irish church =

Irish church may refer to:

- Roman Catholic Church in Ireland
- Church of Ireland, an Anglican denomination
- Presbyterian Church in Ireland

== See also ==
- Christianity in Ireland
- Celtic Christianity
- British church (disambiguation)
