= Scottish church =

The Scottish church may refer to:

- Church of Scotland, a Presbyterian denomination
- Scottish Episcopal Church
- Roman Catholic Church in Scotland

== See also ==
- Christianity in Scotland
- British church (disambiguation)
