= First English Lutheran Church (New Richmond, Wisconsin) =

Historic church in Wisconsin, United States

- U.S. National Register of Historic Places
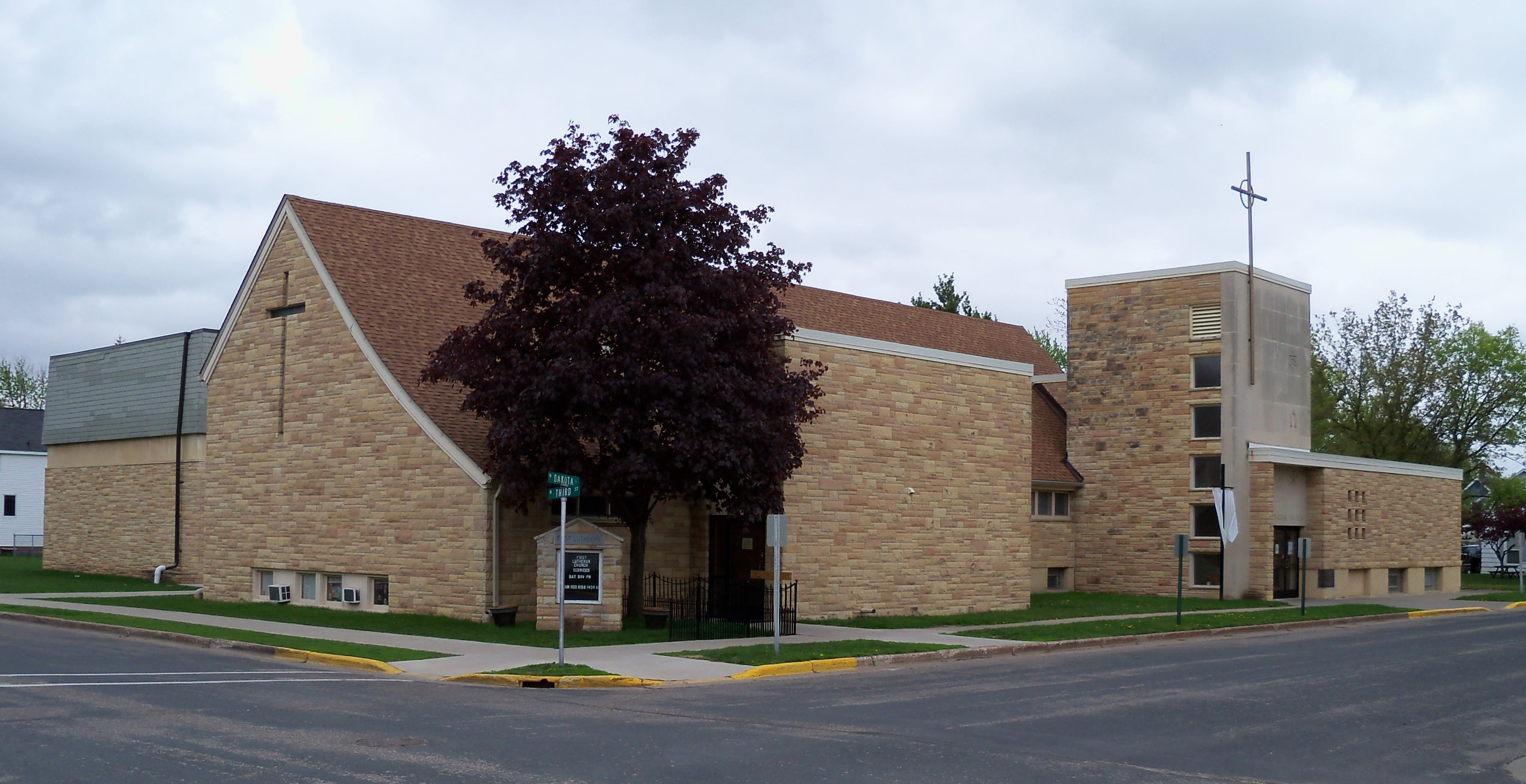

- Location within Wisconsin Location within the United States
- Location: 354 Third St., N New Richmond, Wisconsin
- Coordinates: 45°7′44″N 92°32′31″W
- Area: less than one acre
- Built: 1906
- Architect: B & W Concrete Stone Co.
- Architectural style: Late Gothic Revival
- MPS: New Richmond MRA
- NRHP reference No.: 88000618
- Added to NRHP: May 31, 1988

First English Lutheran Church (St. Thomas Episcopal Church) is a historic church at 354 Third St., North in New Richmond, Wisconsin, United States. It was built in 1906 and was added to the National Register of Historic Places in 1988.

Around 1892, Pastor J.T. Kjollgren organized a Lutheran congregation among the Swedish settlers on the north side of New Richmond. Many of them worked in lumber mills on the north side of the Willow River – especially the Willow River Lumber Company. The congregation was probably called First English Lutheran because it held some worship in the English language. They initially held services in the Norwegian Lutheran Church on North Third Street, renting the space at one dollar per service.

In 1906 the congregation decided to build its own church. They arranged a benefit to raise money for this project, with the Arpi Quartette from Gustavus Adolphus College performing at Hagan's Opera House. Tickets cost from 25¢ for children to 50¢ for reserved seats. Construction began that same year. The first service in the new building was held January 5, 1907 in the basement, because the roof wasn't yet finished.

The general form of the building is a typical small church, with a tower and steeple centered above the front door. The raised foundation is rusticated concrete block. The walls are also cream-colored concrete block, supplied by the B&W Concrete Stone Company of New Richmond. The windows and door are topped with lancet arches, typical of Gothic Revival style. The front tower is square, with the bottom built of block. On that sits a wooden section of the tower which once held a bell. On top of that is an octagonal spire topped with a cross. Inside, the church has been remodeled into an Anglican style.

In 1945 the congregation changed its name to First Lutheran Church, without the modifier English, and merged with Norwegian Lutheran Church. In 1946, St. Thomas Episcopal bought the former First English Lutheran building for $3,300 and has occupied it since. St. Thomas has roots in New Richmond going back to around 1867. They had a church building which was destroyed by the 1899 tornado. After that they worshiped in members' homes for almost fifty years before buying the Lutheran church in 1946.

The NRHP nomination considers the building significant as a remnant of the Scandinavian community on the north side of New Richmond. It is also the only old church in New Richmond still used as a church.
