= English Church (Bad Homburg) =

Coordinates: 50°13′31″N 8°37′22″E

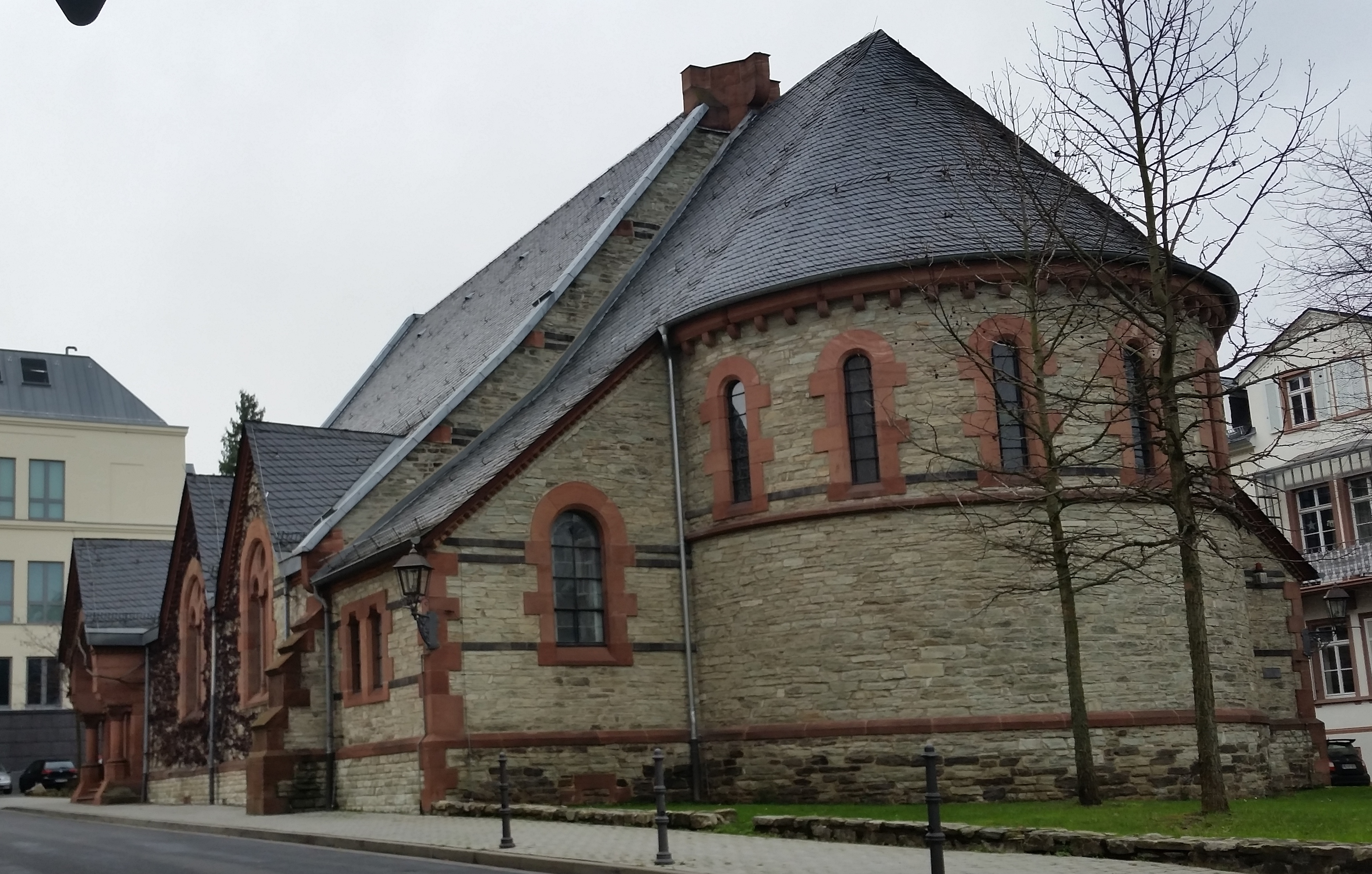
The building's apse.

The English Church (Englische Kirche) is a former Church of England church building in the German city of Bad Homburg in Hesse. It is listed as a historic monument and now houses a cultural centre.

== History ==
In the past, Homburg was best known for its spa, which attracted many tourists from England; in 1857, 20% of the city's 8500 visitors were from that country. That percentage rose after 1876, when it became traditional for people to go to the spa after the end of the parliamentary session in Homburg. An Anglican church was first requested in the town in 1859. Ferdinand, Landgrave of Hesse-Homburg granted a site on Ferdinandsplatz (now Ferdinandstraße 16) in memory of the late Landgräfin Elizabeth, daughter of George III of the United Kingdom and Ferdinand's sister-in-law. The building was partly financed by the Blanc brothers, local hoteliers and casino-owners, and designed by the English architect Ewan Christian. as a two-storey hall church with a semi-enclosed choir and a saddleback slate roof. One of its original stained glass windows is now in the town museum at the Gothic House. It is reminiscent of an English parish church and could stylistically be called Gothic, neo-Gothic, Norman or Romanesque Revival.

Construction began in 1861 and was completed in 1863 or 1865, overseen by Christian Holler (1819–1903). Originally dedicated as Christ Church, it held its first services in 1866, though the building was only officially consecrated on 2 September 1868 by Archibald Campbell Tait, bishop of London. An organ was ordered from J W Walker in London in 1866. A monument to Elizabeth was also erected in 1908 on the patch of grass along the east side of the church.

There were two regular services on Sundays, along with baptisms, weddings and funerals for Anglican and Episcopalian tourists. The last service was held on 6 June 1914 and the building was seized by the town authorities and de-consecrated after the outbreak of World War One. On 19 August 1916 it reopened as the town history museum (Städtische Heimatmuseum), which remained there until moving to Bad Homburg Castle in 1925. The building then remained empty until being turned into a concert hall in 1946.

In 1953 the town transferred the building's organ to the new Roman Catholic Heilig-Kreuz Kirche in the Gonzenheim district of Bad Homburg – it is now the only surviving 19th century English organ in Germany. The building was renovated in 1964 to host plays, lectures, conferences and exhibitions. From 1989 to 1990 a second restoration by the architect Reinhold Kargel of Darmstadt added a new foyer outside the building's west door (connected to the original via a glass corridor), using materials which matched the original building. It reopened on 14 September 1990 as a cultural centre, hosting jazz, cabaret, 'Kleinkunst' and classical concerts, lectures and exhibitions.

== Gallery ==
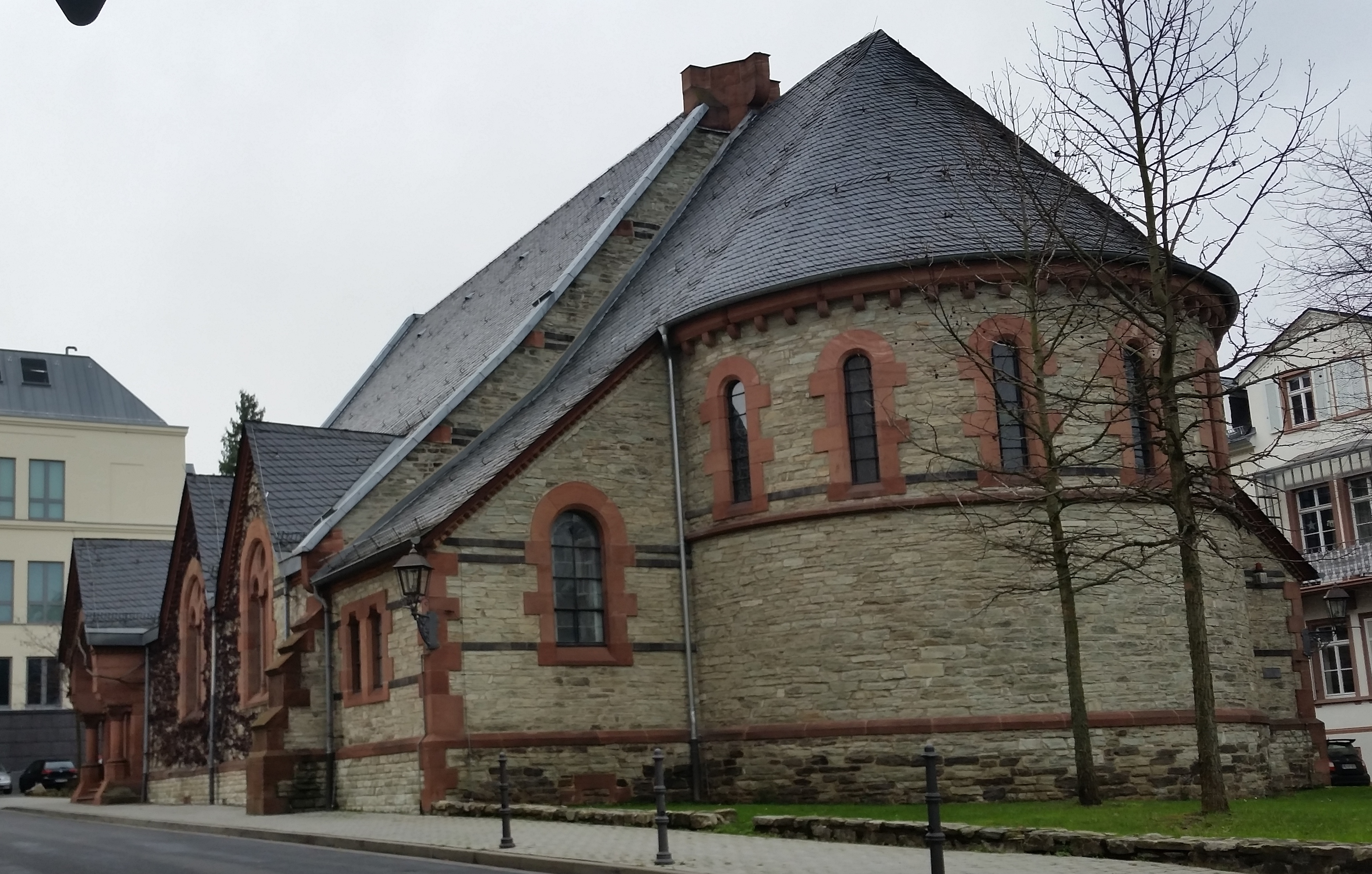
From the south-east

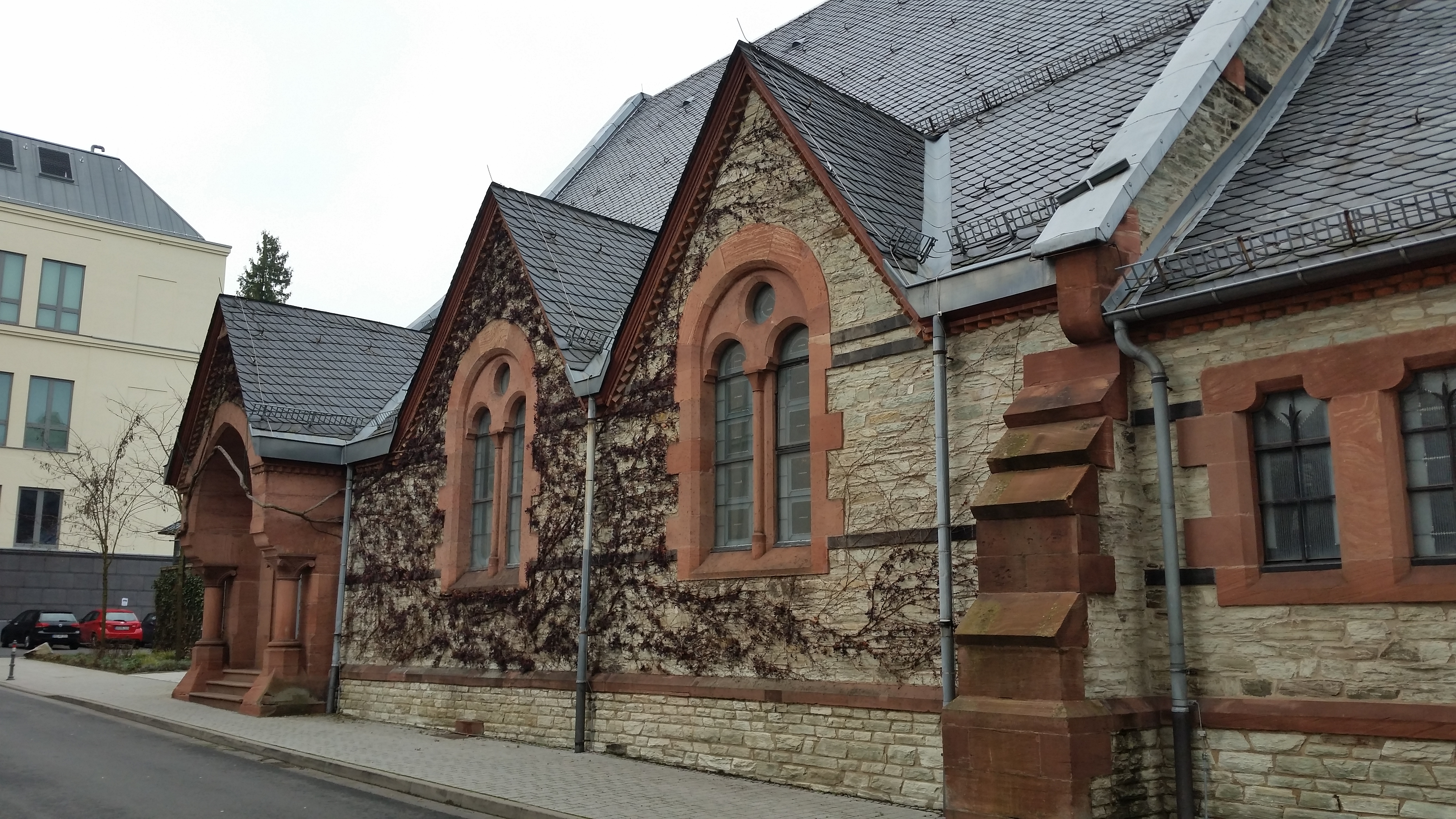
Former main entrance

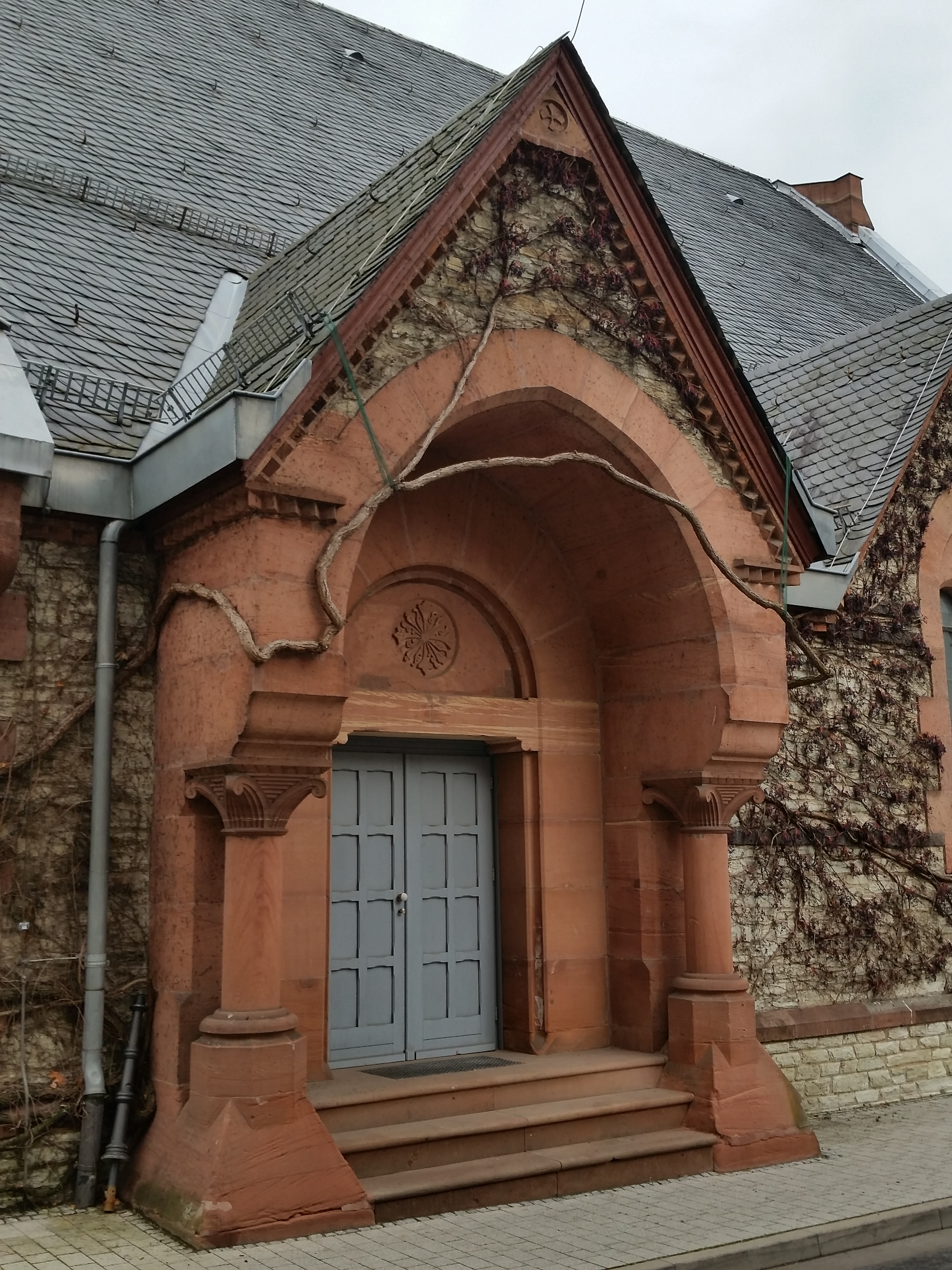
Main entrance

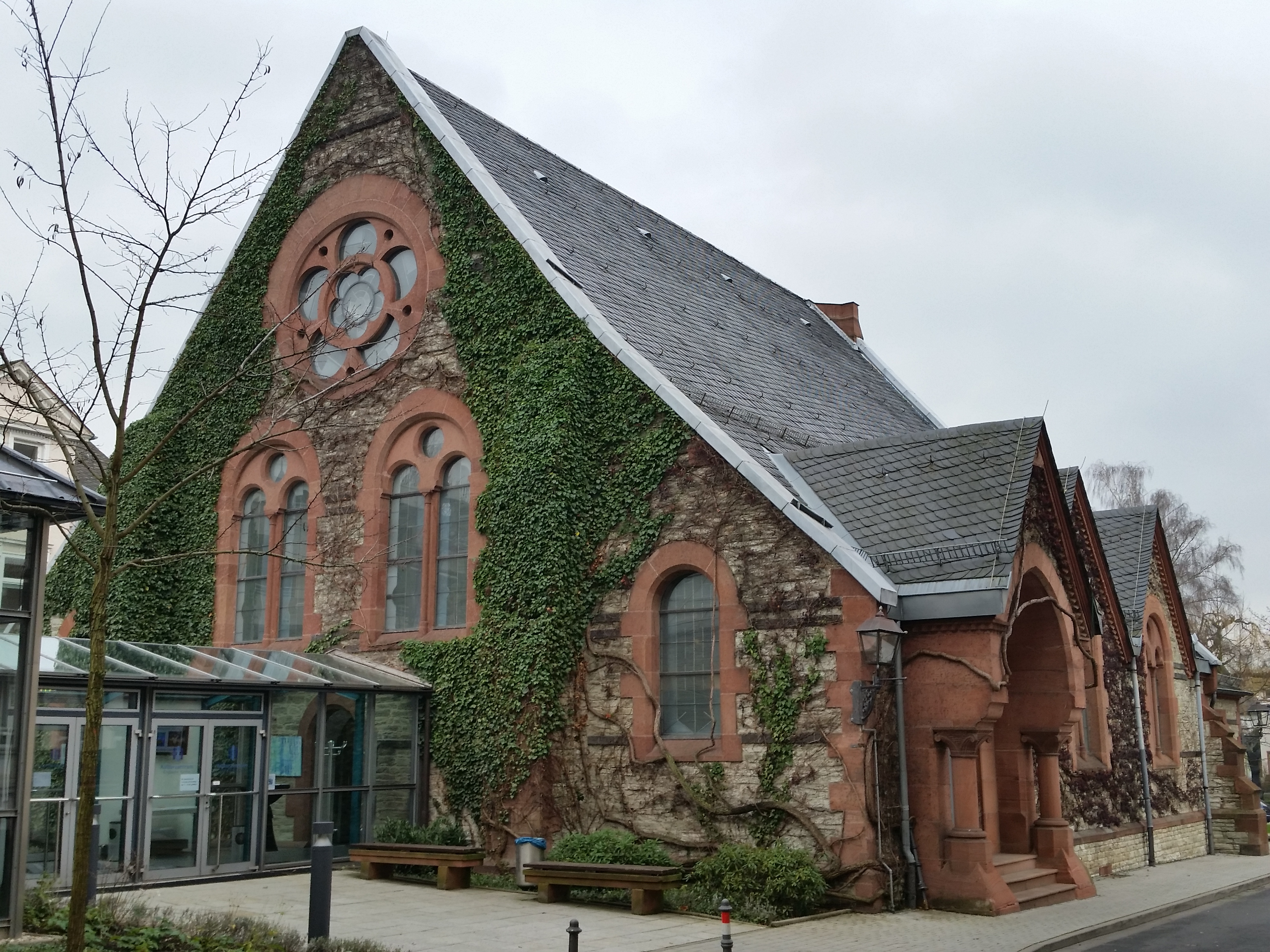
The glass corridor

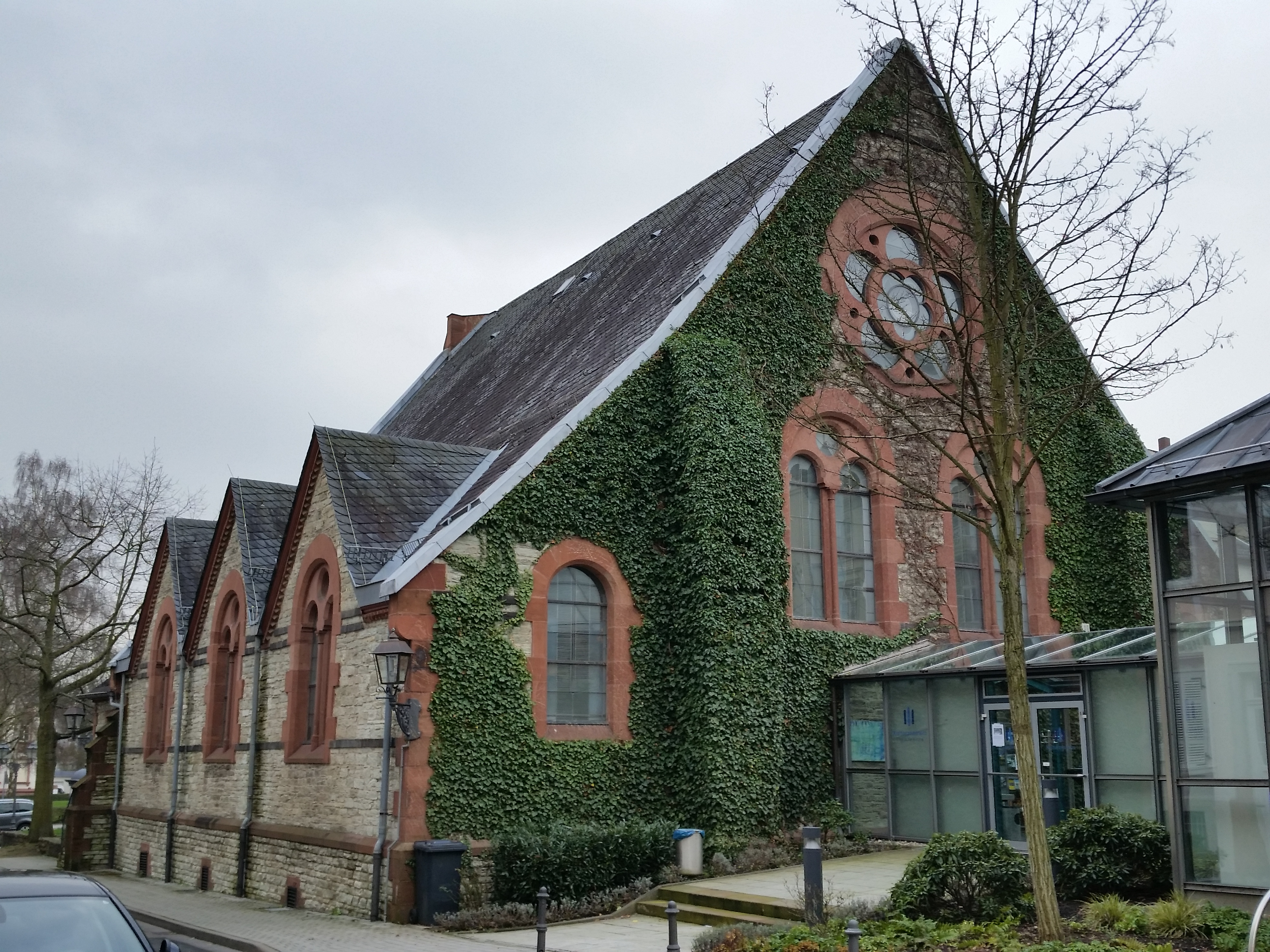
From the north

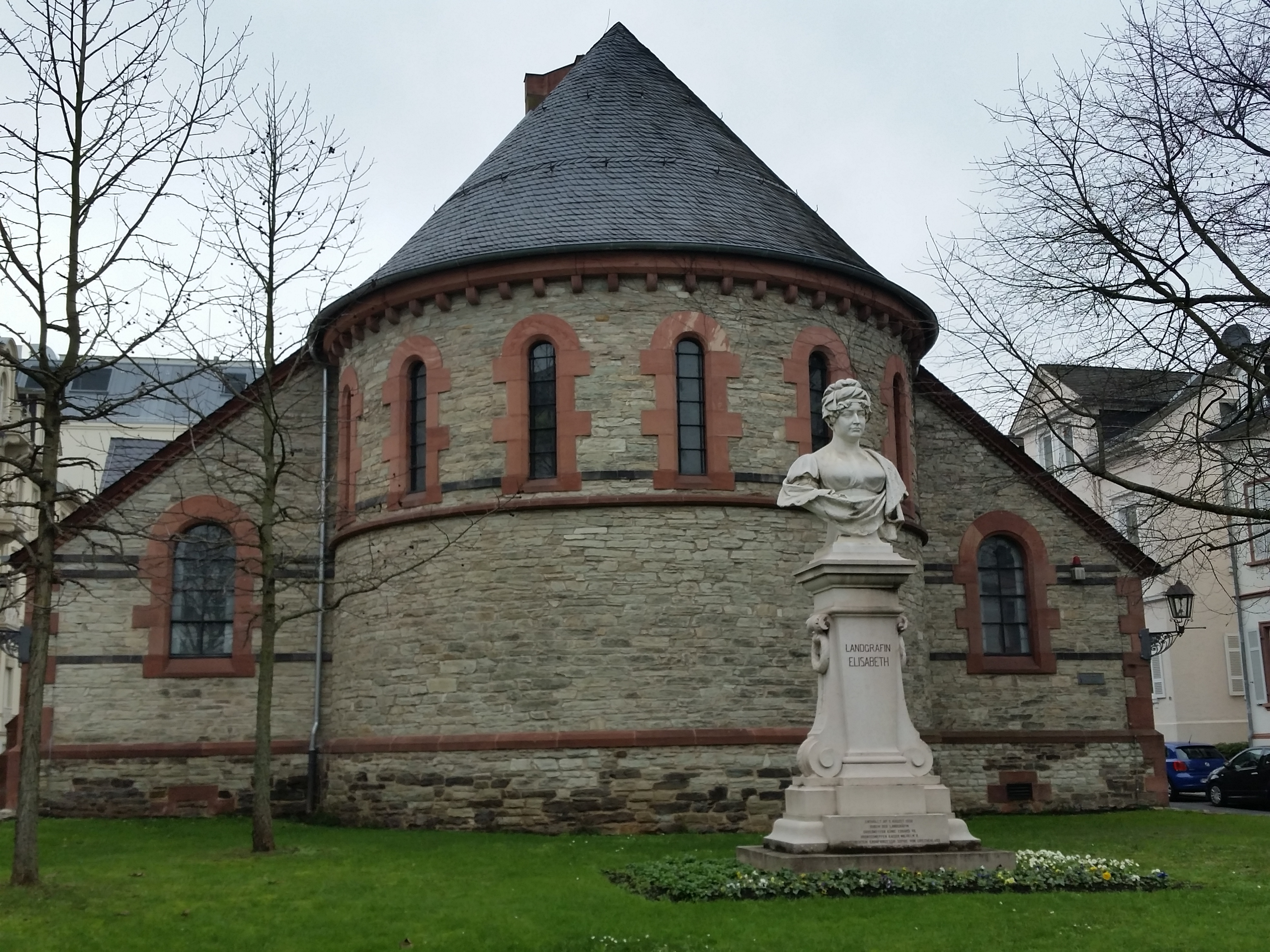
Apse and memorial to Elizabeth

== Bibliography ==
- (in German) Siegfried Rudolf Carl Theodor Enders: Kultbauten ausländischer Gäste in europäischen Kur- und Badestädten – ein vernachlässigtes, gemeinsames Erbe ? In: ICOMOS, Hefte des Deutschen Nationalkomitees, Nr.52, Stuttgart 2012, ISBN 978-3-8062-2729-1, S. 201 – 210, hier S. 207
