= Ancient British Church in North America =

Christian denomination

The Ancient British Church in North America is a small Christian denomination founded by Jonathan Vartan Zotique and based in Toronto, Ontario, Canada. It is a Western Rite Orthodox church. Although it identifies with Catholic and Eastern Orthodox traditions, it is in communion with neither the Roman Catholic Church nor the Eastern Orthodox Church.

== History ==
Jonathan Vartan Zotique (original name Thomas William Brennand) was ordained as a bishop in the Old Catholic Church (Latin rite) by its primate, Boniface Grosvold, on 12 September 1976, taking the ecclesiastical name Mar Zitikos. He founded the Ancient British Church in North America, with its headquarters in Toronto, to reach out to communities not being served by Roman Catholic and Eastern Orthodox communions, such as LGBT people and drug addicts. The church adopted as its rite the Autocephalous Glastonbury Rite in Diaspora.

== Organization ==
The church ordains both women and men as priests and has a single monastic order (Celtic-Catholic Culdee Community of Orthodox Monks, Hermits, Missionaries and Evangelists of the Old Church of the Blessed Virgin, St. Mary of Glastonbury, Our Lady of Avalon, in Diaspora). The clergy are self-supporting worker clerics. Church polity is episcopal with a presiding bishop who governs in consultation with the church's synod.
