= First English Lutheran Church (Syracuse, New York) =

Historic church in New York, United States

- U.S. National Register of Historic Places
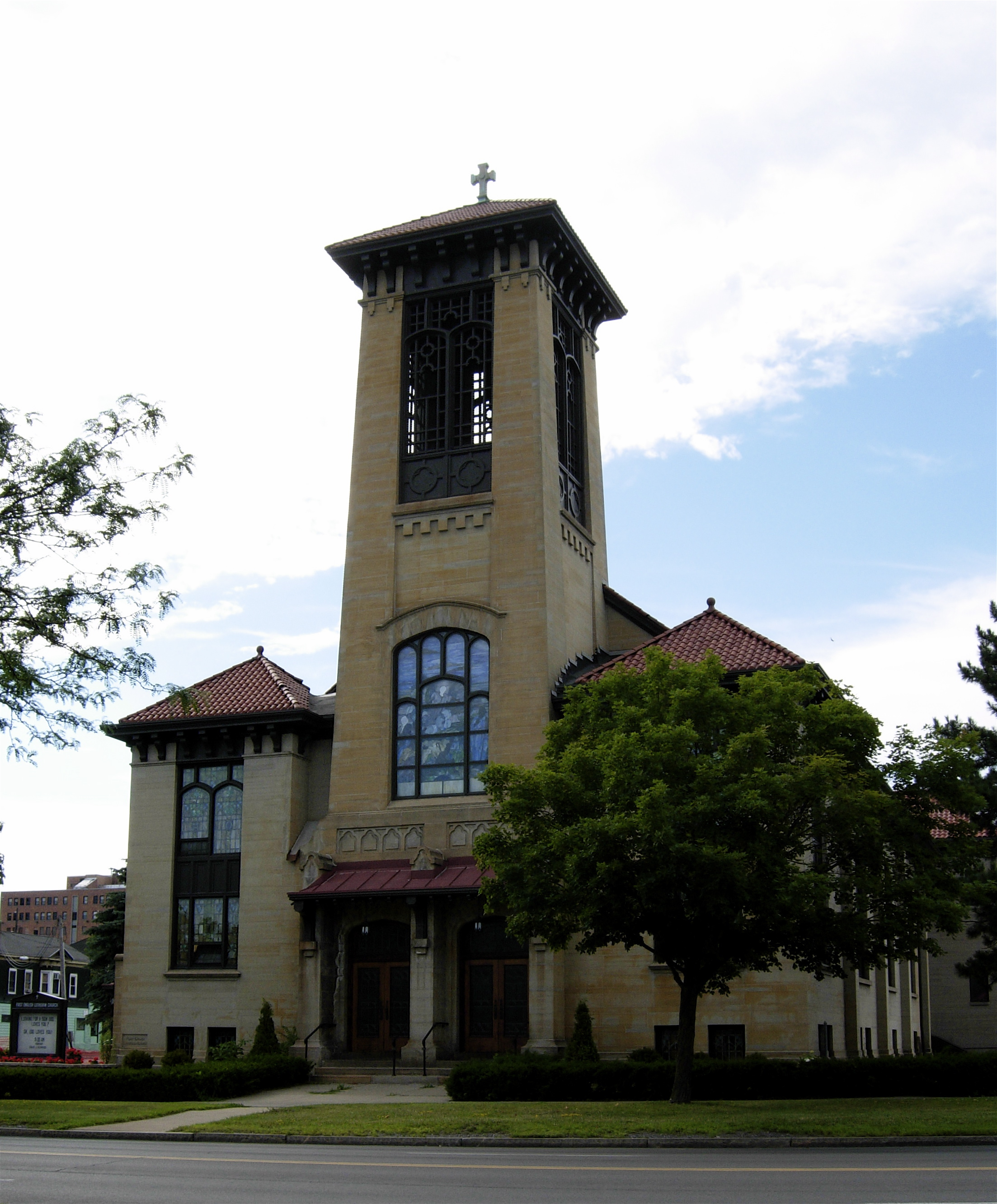

- Location within New York Location within the United States
- Location: 501 James St., Syracuse, New York
- Coordinates: 43°3′14″N 76°8′46″W
- Built: 1911
- Architect: Archimedes Russell, Melvin King
- Architectural style: Mission/Spanish Revival
- NRHP reference No.: 98000139
- Added to NRHP: March 4, 1998

First English Lutheran Church was founded in 1879 Syracuse, New York. The building was designed by Archimedes Russell and built in 1911. It is significant for its mission-inspired architecture.

The church's mission statement says that it is "a safe, spiritual haven for sharing the truth and love of the gospel of Jesus Christ" and that they "welcome all people regardless of race, creed, color or sexual orientation for worship and community services," that they "respect the needs of a changing world, maintain a history of our Lutheran roots and heritage, recognize our God given talents, especially the gift of music, grow as we reach out to serve our neighbors, friends of FEL, as well as each other," and that they "hope, trust and pray that we might fulfill God's mission to share our many blessings."

The building was added to the National Register of Historic Places in 1998.
