= Celtic mass =

The Celtic mass is the liturgy of the Christian office of the Mass as it was celebrated within Celtic Rite of Celtic Christianity in the Early Middle Ages.

== Sources ==
Two books, the Bobbio and the Stowe Missals, contain the Irish Ordinary of a daily Mass in its late Romanized form. Many of the variables are in the Bobbio book, and portions of some Masses are in the Carlsruhe and Piacenza fragments. A little, also, may be gleaned from the St. Gall fragments, the Bangor Antiphonary, and the order for the Communion of the Sick in the Books of Dimma, Mulling, and Deer. The tract in Irish at the end of the Stowe Missal and its variant in the Leabhar Breac add something more to our knowledge. The Stowe Missal gives us three somewhat differing forms, the original of the ninth century, in so far as it has not been erased, the correction by Moelcaich, and, as far as it goes, the Mass described in the Irish tract. From its size and contents it would seem to be a sort of Missale Itinerantium, with an Ordinary that might serve for most any occasion, a general Common of Saints and two Masses for special intentions (for penitents and for the dead). The addition of the Order of Baptism, not, as in the Bobbio book or in the "Missale Gothicum" ad Missale Gallicanum, as part of the Easter Eve services, but as a separate thing, and the Visitation of the Sick, points to its being intended to be a convenient portable minimum for a priest. The pieces said by the people are in several cases only indicated by beginnings and endings. The Bobbio book, on the other hand, is a complete Missal, also for a priest only, of larger size with Masses for the Holy Days through the year.

The original Stowe Mass approaches nearer to that of Bobbio than the revised form does. The result of Moelcaich's version is to produce something more than a Gelasian Canon inserted into a non-Roman Mass. It has become a mixed Mass, Gelasian, Roman, or Romano-Ambrosian for the most part, with much of a Hispano-Gallican type underlying it, and perhaps with some indigenous details. The title of the Bobbio daily Mass is Missa Romensis cottidiana, and the same title occurs before the Collect Deus qui culpa offenderis at the very end of the Missale Gothicum. This collect, which is in the Gregorian Sacramentary, occurs in both the Bobbio and the Stowe, and in the latter has before it the title, Orationes et preces missae aecclesiae romane, so that it is evident that the Roman additions or substitutions were recognised as such.

== Liturgy ==
The Order of the daily Mass, founded on that in the Stowe Missal is as follows:

- Praeparatio Sacerdotis. Confession of sins, beginning "Peccavimus, Domine, peccavimus". This and the Litany which follows are found also in the St. Gall fragments, but not in the Bobbio book.
- Litany of the Saints. In the original hand there are only thirteen invocations (Our Lady, ten Apostles, St. Mark, and St. Luke). Moelcaich added thirty-one more, of which twenty-four are Irish. The manuscript is wrongly bound, so that these additions look as if they were associated with the diptychs in the Canon.
- Oratio. The "Oratio Augustini" ("Rogo te Deus Sabaoth") is found in various ninth- and tenth-century French books (see Warren's "Celtic Church"). The Oratio Ambrosi ("Ante conspectum divinae majestatis") is inserted by Moelcaich and found in several French books.
- Collect. "Ascendat oratio nostra". This occurs after the Creed and Paternoster in the "Liber Hymnorum".

From the Irish tracts it seems that the chalice was prepared before the Introit, a very usual practice in both East and West in early times. It is still the Eastern practice, and is retained to this day by the Dominicans at low mass and in the Mozarabic Rite. Water was poured in first with the words "Peto (Leabhar Breac, Quaeso) te, Pater, deprecor te, Fili, obsecro te, Spiritus Sancte". The Leabhar Breac directs that a drop shall be poured at naming each person of the trinity. The wine was similarly poured on the water, with the words, "Reditit pater, indulget Filius, miseretur Spiritus Sanctus." The Introit is mentioned in the Irish tracts but not given in the ordinary or elsewhere in either missal. Probably it was sung from a psalter.

=== The collect ===
The Collect, in the Stowe and Bobbio Ordinaries is Deus qui de beato Petro, the collect for St. Peter's Day, "iii Kal Julias" in the Gelasian Sacramentary. In the Stowe a corrector, not Moelcaich, has prefixed "in solemnitatibus Petri et Christi" [sic]. Imnus angelicus, i.e. Gloria in excelsis. Begun in the original hand, continued by Moel Caich on an inserted slip. This comes after the conclusion of the Missa Romensis cottidiana in the Bobbio book and is preceded by a prayer "post Alos," which probably means the Trisagion (Hagios o Theos, k.t.l.), or the Greek of the Sanctus, as used elsewhere in the Mozarabic, one or other of which may have come at this point, as it did (according to St. Germanus of Paris) in the Gallican Rite. This in the last was followed by Kyrie eleison and Benedictus, the latter being called "Prophetia". There are collects styled "post Prophetiam" in the Bobbio Missal at the beginnings of several Masses. After the Gloria in the Bobbio there is a collect post Benedictionem (after the Benedicite). This was said in the Gallican, as part is still said in the Mozarabic, after the Epistle. The collects post Precem, according to Mabillon, mean the same, but that seems improbable, and this name may possibly refer to the prayers after the Bidding Prayer Litany, which has been known as "Prex".

- Collect, "Deus qui diligentibus te", given as a Sunday collect in the Gelasian. It is written by Moel Caich over erased matter (probably the original continuation of "Gloria in excelsis"), and another hand has prefixed a direction for its use. "in cotidianis diebus", instead of that which follows.
- Collect "Deus qui culpa offenderis". In the original hand with inserted heading already mentioned, and "haec oratio prima Petri". It follows the St. Peter collect in the Bobbio Ordinary.

A Hic augmentum, inserted by Moel Caich, probably means additional proper collects. It is mentioned in the Irish tract as tormach (increase, expansion) coming before the Lesson of the Apostle. Later, at the Offertory, one finds secunda pars augmenti hic super oblata. St. Columbanus uses the word, in the sense of "addition", with reference to petitions added to the psalms at the day hours, cum versiculorum augmento intervenientium.

=== The epistle ===
The Epistle, in the Stowe daily Mass, is I Cor., xi, 26–52. On certain days the Bobbio had a lesson from the Old Testament or Apocalypse before the Epistle.

=== The Gradual ===
The Gradual – the tract calls it "salm digrad". If this includes everything between the epistle and gospel, the construction is:

1. Prayer Deus qui nos regendo conservas, added, not by Moel Caich. Found in the later Gelasian manuscripts.
2. Prayer, Omnipotens sempiterne Deus, qui populum tuum. An Easter collect in the Bobbio Missal, given also by Gerbert as Ambrosian.
3. Psalm civ, vv. 4, 1–3, 4.
4. Prayer Grata sint tibi Domine. The secreta of an Advent Mass in the Gelasian.
5. Alleluia. Ps. cxvii, 14.
6. Prayer Sacrificiis praesentibus, Domine. The "secreta of another Advent Mass in the Gelasian. #Deprecatio Sancti Martini pro populo. The title was added by Moel Caich.) This is a Bidding Prayer Litany or Prex resembling very closely the Great Synapte of the Greek Rite and the litany used on the first four Sundays of Lent instead of Gloria in excelsis in the Ambrosian.
7. Prayer Sacrificium tibi, Domine. The secreta of another Advent Mass in the Gelasian. Perhaps it is here an "Oratio post Precem" of the Gallican type.
8. Prayer Ante oculos tuos, Domine. It occurs in the same place in the Mass published by M. Flaccus Illyricus (Martène, I, 182).
9. Lethdirech sund. A half uncovering of the chalice and paten here. This is referred to in the tract as indinochtad corrici leth inna oblae agus incailich (the uncovering as far as half the oblation and chalice), and is associated there with the singing of the Gospel and Allóir. Earlier it is mentioned as following the Gradual.
10. Psalm cxl, 2, sung thrice.
11. Hic elivatur lintiamen calicis. Dr. Legg (Ecclesiological Essays, p. 133) mentions that this lifting of the veil was the practice in England just before the Reformation and in the Dioceses of Coutances and St.-Pol-de-Leon much later.
12. Prayer Veni Domine sanctificator. Nearly the {"Veni sanctificator" of the present Roman Offertory.

1 to 8 are in the original hand, part of 9 is inserted by Moel Caich, possibly over erasures, the rest is written by Moel Caich on added leaves. The psalm verses are only indicated by their beginnings and endings. Perhaps the prayers were said and the ceremonies with the chalice veil were performed by the priest while the congregation sang the psalms and Alleluia. Nothing of all this is in the Bobbio. Possibly, judging from the collect Post Benedictionem, which is the collect which follows the Benedictus es (Dan., iii) on Ember Saturdays in the Roman missal, either the Benedicite or this Benedictus came between the Epistle and Gospel, as in the Gallican Rite of St. Germain's description.

=== The Gospel and Creed ===
Gospel reading. In the Stowe Mass, this is St. John vi, 51–57. This begins in Moel Caich's hand on an inserted sheet and ends in the original hand. The tracts say that the Gospel was followed by the "Alloir", which Dr. Stokes translates "Alleluia", but Macgregor takes to mean "blessing" and compares with the Per evangelica dicta, etc., of the Roman rite.

An Oratio Gregorii super evangelium is included, on an inserted slip in Moel Caich's hand. In the Gregorian Sacramentary on the second Saturday and third Sunday of Lent, but not in connection with the Gospel. The Creed is in the original hand, with the "Filioque" inserted between the lines, possibly by Moel Caich.

=== Offertory ===
The order of the offertory in the Stowe Missal is:

1. Landirech sund (a full uncovering here). In Moel Caich's hand.
2. Ostende nobis, Domine, misericordiam, etc. thrice.
3. Oblata, Domine, munera sanctifica, nosque a peccatorum nostrorum maculis emunda. This is in the Bobbio Missal (where it is called "post nomina") and in the Gelasian and Gregorian. It is the secreta of the third mass of Christmas Day in the Roman missals until 1962. According to the tract, the chalice was elevated while this was sung, after the full uncovering. The Leabhar Breac says that it was elevated quando cantitur Imola Deo sacrificum laudis.
4. Prayer Hostias quaesumus, Domine. This occurs in one set of "Orationes et preces divinae" in the Leonine Sacramentary. It is written here by Moel Caich over an erasure which begins with "G", probably, as Warner conjectures, the prayer "Grata sit tibi", which follows "Oblata, Domine" in the Bobbio Missal. In Moelcaich's correction this in an amplified form occurs later.
5. Prayer Has oblationes et sincera labamina. In Moel Caich's hand. This prayer, which includes an intercession pro animabus carorum nostrorum N. et cararum nostrarum quorum nomina recitamus, is evidently a relic of the former reading of the dyptychs at this point, as in the Hispano-Gallican liturgies. It and the next prayer in its Stowe form, as Warren points out, resemble Gallican or Mozarabic "Orationes post nomina".
6. Secunda pars augmenti hic super oblata. Probably refers to additional proper prayers, analogous to the Roman secreta (see 7, supra).
7. Prayer Grata sit tibi haec oblatio. An expanded form of the prayer which followed Oblata in the original writing. A long passage referring to the diptychs is inserted. Most of this prayer is on the first page of an inserted quire of four leaves in Moel Caich's hand. In the Bobbio, only Oblata and Grata sit tibi are given at the Offertory, one being called Post nomina, the other Ad Pacem. Perhaps the Pax came here in the seventh century, as in the Gallican and Mozarabic.
8. The "Sursum Corda", not preceded by "Dominus vobiscum".

The Preface, unlike the Bobbio daily Preface, which, like that of the Roman Missal, goes straight from per Christum Dominum nostrum to per quem, inserts a long passage, reminding one, at the beginning and near the end, of the Trinity and Sunday Preface of the Roman Missal but otherwise being unique. At the end is a direction in Irish to the effect that here the "dignum of the addition" (dignum in tormaig), i.e. the Proper Preface, comes in, if it ends with per quem. There is then a similar direction if the "addition ends with Sanctus". The Sanctus, with a Post-Sanctus, resembles that in the Mozarabic missal for Christmas day and that for Christmas eve in the Missale Gothicum. There is also a Post-Sanctus in the first of the three masses given in the Stowe. It is followed by Qui pridie, as though the Gelasian Canon were not used in that case.

The follows a Canon dominicus papae Gilasi, the Gelasian Canon (as given in H.A. Wilson's edition) with certain variations, the most noticeable of which are:

1. Te igitur adds, after papa nostro, episcopo sedis apostolicae, and after fidei cultoribus" et abbate nostro n. episcopl. Sedis apostolicae is added also in the Bobbio.
2. A direction follows, Hic recitantur nomina vivorum.
3. Memente etiam domine, contains a long list of intercessions for various classes of persons. This is also found in Carlsruhe Fragment B, but not in the Bobbio.
4. "Communicantes". Variants for Christmas, Circumcision (called Kalendis), Stellae (that is Epiphany – compare Welsh, Dydd Gwyl Ystwyll; Cornish, Degl Stul; and in stilla domini in the St Cuthbert Gospels. The actual variant here is natalis calicis (Maundy Thursday), the end of one and the beginning of the other have been dropped out in copying, Easter, Clausula pasca (Low Sunday), Ascension, and Pentecost. The inserted quire ends with the second of these, and the others are on a whole palimpsest page and part of another. The original hand, now partly erased, begins with part of the first clause of the Canon, tuum dominum nostrum supplices te rogamus, and contained all but the first line of the Te igitur and Memento clauses, without the long intercessory passage, the nomina vivorum direction, or the variants.
5. The original hand begins, Et memoriam venerantes, continuing as in the present Roman Canon without variation until the next clause. The Bobbio Canon includes saints Hilary, Martin, Ambrose, Augustine, Gregory, Jerome, and Benedict.
6. Hanc igitur oblationem contains an interpolation referring to a church quam famulus tuus. . .aedificavit, and praying that the founder may be converted from idols. There are many variables of the Hanc igitur in the Gelasian. In the daily Mass the Bobbio inserts quam tibi offerimus in honorem nominis tui Deus after cunctae familiae tuae, but otherwise is the ordinary Gelasian and Gregorian.
7. In Quam oblationem and Qui pridie there are only a few variations; egit for agens, acepit (calicem) for accipiens (as also in the Bobbio book), and calix sancti sanguinis mei (sancti is erased in the Bobbio), until the end, when Moel Caich has added the Ambrosian phrase passionem meam predicabitis, resurrectionem meam adnuntiabitis, adventum meum sperabitis, donec iterum veniam ad vos de coelis. Similar endings occur also in the Liturgies of St. Mark and St. James and in several Syrian liturgies. The tracts direct the priest to bow thrice at accipit Jesus panem and after offering the chalice to God to chant Miserere mei Deus (Leabhar Breac) and the people to kneel in silence during this, the "perilous prayer". Then the priest takes three steps backwards and forwards.
8. Unde et memores has a few evident mistakes and is Gelasian in adding sumus after memores.
9. Supplices te rogamus adds et petimus and omits caelesti.
10. Memento etiam Domine et eorum nomina qui nos praecessereunt com signo fidei et dormiunt in somno pacis. This clause, omitted in the Gelasian, agrees with the Bobbio. In the latter the words commemoratio defunctorum follow. In the Stowe there is an intercessory interpolation with a long list of names of Old Testament saints, apostles and others, many of whom are Irish. The list concludes with the phrase, used also in the Mozarabic, et omnium pausantium. Moel Caich's addition to the Praeparatio Litany is wrongly inserted before these names.
11. Nobis quoque differs from the Gelasian in the order of the names of the female saints, agreeing with the Bobbio, except that it does not add Eugenia.
12. After Per quem haec omnia Moel Caich has added ter canitur and an Irish direction to elevate the principal host over the chalice and to dip half of it therein. Then follows in the original hand Fiat Domine misericordia tua etc. (Ps. xxxii, 22), to which ter cantitur probably refers.

Moel Caich adds an Irish direction, "it is here that the bread is broken". The original hand has Cogno[v]erunt Dominum in fractione panis. Panis quem frangimus corpus est D. N. J. C. Calix quem benedicimus sanguis est D. N. J. C. in remissionem peccatorum nostrorum, interspersed with six Alleluias. Then over an erasure, Moelcaich inserts Fiat Domine misericordia, etc. Cognoverunt Dominum Alleluia, and a prayer or confession of faith, Credimus, Domine, credimus in hac confractione. This responsory answers to the Ambrosian Confractorium and the Mozarabic Antiphona ad Confractionem panis. Fiat misericordia etc. is the actual Lenten Mozarabic antiphon. The prayer Credimus etc. has a slight likeness to the recitation of the Creed at this point in the Mozarabic. The tract directs an elaborate fraction, varying according to the day, and resembling that of the Mozarabic rite and the arrangement (before Consecration) in the Eastern office of the Prothesis and like these having mystical meanings. The common division is into five, for ordinary days; for saints and virgins, seven; for martyrs, eight; for "the oblation of Sunday as a figure of the nine households of heaven and nine grades of the church", nine; for the Apostles, eleven; on the circumcision and Maundy Thursday twelve; on Low Sunday (minchasc) and Ascension, thirteen; and on Easter, Christmas, and Whitsunday, the sum of all the preceding, sixty-five. Directions are given to arrange the particles in the form of a cross within a circle, and different parts are apportioned to different classes of people. The Leabhar Breac omits all this and only speaks (as does the Stowe tract earlier) of a fraction in two-halves, a reuniting and a commixture, the last of which in the Stowe Canon comes after the Pater Noster. There is nothing about any fraction or commixture in the Bobbio, which, like the Gelasian, goes on from the Per quem haec omnia clause to the introduction of the pater noster. In the Ambrosian rite both the breaking of bread and mingling of wine occur at this point, instead of after the pater noster, as in the Roman. [In the St. Gall fragment there are three collects (found in the Gelasian, Leonine, and Gregorian books), and a Collectio ante orationem dominicam, which ends with the same introduction to the pater noster as in Stowe and Bobbio. These are all that come between the preface and the pater noster. The rest onward to the end of the communion is in Moel Caich's hand.

The pater noster is preceded by the introduction: Divino magisterio edocti (instead of the Roman praeceptis salutaribus moniti) et divina institutione formati audemus dicere. This is the same in the Bobbio and the St. Gall fragment. There is nothing to show that this and the embolism which follows were variable, as in the Gallican (cf. Missale Gothicum and others) and the present Mozarabic. The embolism in the Stowe is nearly exactly the Gelasian, except that it omits the name of Our Lady and has Patricio for Andrea. The Bobbio embolism includes the Virgin Mary but not St. Andrew nor St. Patrick. The pater noster in the Books of Deer, Dimma, and Mulling has a different introduction and embolism and in the communion of the sick in the Stowe there is yet another.

The Pax: Pax et caritas D. N. J. C. et communicatio sanctorum omnium sit semper nobiscum. Et cum spiritu tuo. This is in the St. Gall fragment, in the same place. Prayer, Pacem mandasti, pacem dedisti, etc.

The Commixture. Commixtio corporis et sanguinis D.N.J.C. sit nobis salus in vitam perpetuam. These words are not in the Bobbio or the St. Gall fragment but in the latter the commixture is ordered to be made here (mittit sacerdos sancta in calicem), and then the Pax to be given. In St. Germanus's description a form very like the Pax formula of the Stowe was said here by a priest, instead of a longer (and variable) benediction by a bishop. These were not in any way associated with the Pax, which in the Gallican, as now in the Mozarabic, came just before Sursum corda. The two ideas are mixed up here, as in the Roman and Ambrosian.

The Communion: Ecce Agnus Dei, ecce qui tollis [sic] peccata mundi. These words, not in the Bobbio or the St. Gall, are nearly the words said before the communion of the people in the Roman rite. In the St. Gall the rubric directs the Communion of the people after the Pax. Probably these words had the same association in the Stowe as at present. Then follows in the Stowe, Pacem meam do vobis, Pacem relinquo vobis [John, xiv, 27]. Pax multa diligentibus legem tuam Domine, Et non-est in illis scandalum. Regem coeli cum pace, Plenum odorem vitae, Novum carmen cantate, Omnes sancti venite. Venite comedite panem meorum, Et bibite vinum quod miscui vobis. Dominus regit me [Ps. xxii, 1], with Alleluia after each clause. The St. Gall has only the quotation from John 14:27, before Psalm 22; but Venite comedite comes later. In the Bangor Antiphonary is a hymn of eleven four-lined stanzas, "Sancti venite, Christi corpus sumite", entitled "Ymnus quando comonicarent sacerdotes".) Then follow in the Stowe, the St. Gall, and in the Communion of the Sick in the Stowe, and in the Books of Deer, Dimma, and Mulling, a number of communion antiphons. The Bangor Antiphonary also gives a set. No two sets are alike, but some antiphons are common to nearly all. There is a resemblance to the Communion responsory, called Ad accedentes, of the Mozarabic rite, and similar forms are found in Eastern liturgies, sometimes with the same words. Possibly the Tricanum of St. Germanus was something of the same sort.

At the end of these in the Stowe is the colophon Moel Caich scripsit, with which Moel Caich's corrections and additions to the mass end.

=== Post communion ===
The post communion Quos coelisti dono stasti is a Sunday post-communion in the Gelasian, for the Sixth Sunday after Pentecost in the Gregorian and for the Sixth Sunday after Trinity in the Sarum. It is given in the daily mass in the Bobbio, with the title Post communionem, and in the St. Gall. There are post-communions to the three masses which follow later. Two are Gelasian and the third is a form of a Gallican Praefatio or bidding prayer. Consummatio missae is the title in the Bobbio to the prayer Gratias tibi agimus.... qui nos corporis et sanguinis Christi filii tui communione satiasti, which ends the Mass there, in the Stowe and in the St. Gall. It seems to be compounded of two prayers in the Leonine (Jul. xxiv, and Sept. iii.) In the Gallican books it is a variable prayer. The dismissal formula in the Stowe is "Missa acta est in pace".
