= First English Lutheran Church (Mansfield, Ohio) =

Historic church in Ohio, United States

- U.S. National Register of Historic Places
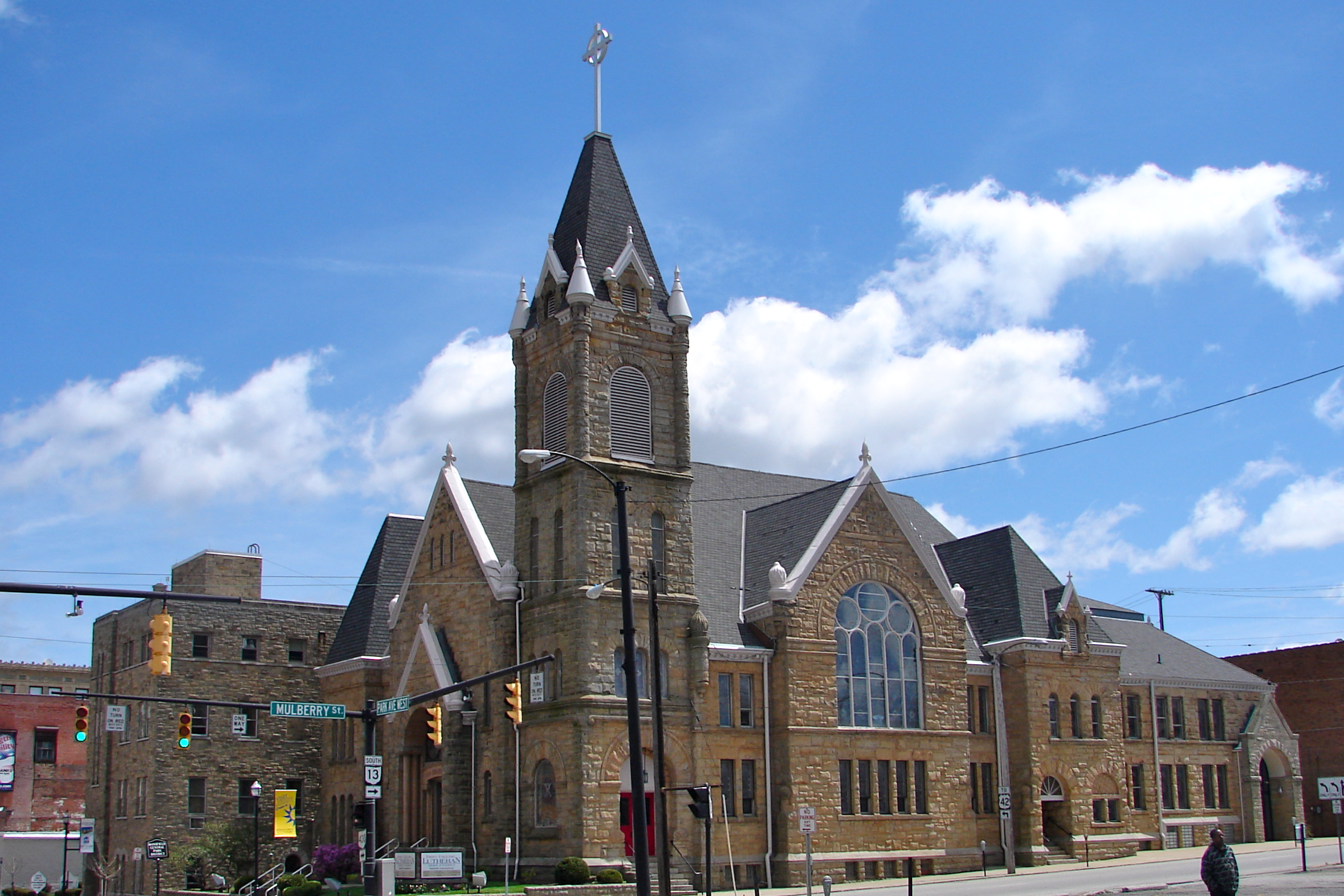

- Location within Ohio Location within the United States
- Location: 53 Park Ave., W., Mansfield, Ohio
- Coordinates: 40°45′30″N 82°31′4″W
- Area: less than one acre
- Built: 1891
- Architectural style: Romanesque, Victorian Romanesque
- MPS: Park Avenue West MRA
- NRHP reference No.: 83002032
- Added to NRHP: July 8, 1983

First English Lutheran Church is a historic church in Mansfield, Ohio. The cornerstone of the church was laid in September 1891 and the building itself was dedicated for use in 1894. The building was added to the National Register of Historic Places in 1983.
