= Church architecture in Scotland =

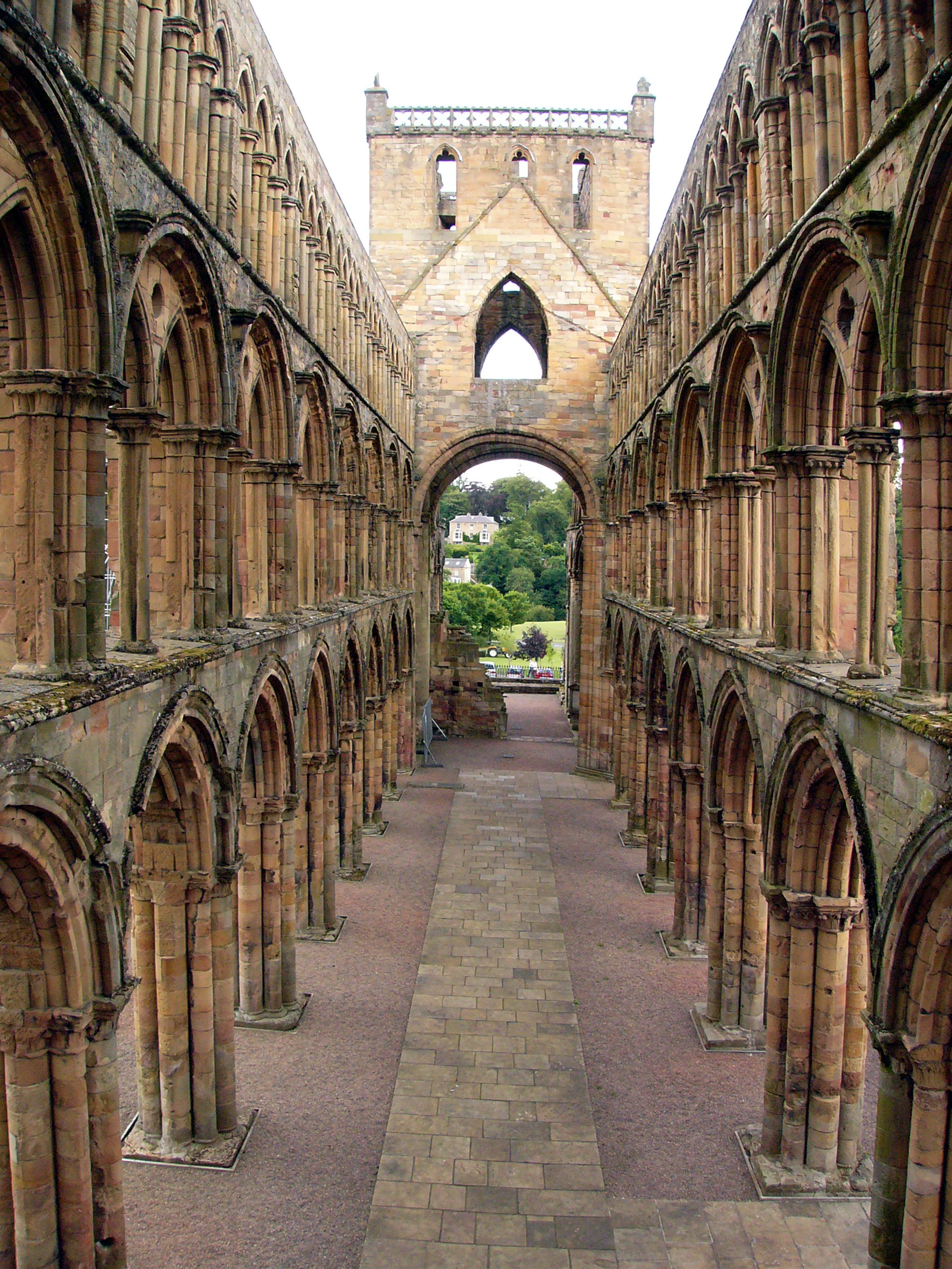
The nave of Jedburgh Abbey, one of the most complete Romanesque buildings to survive in Scotland.

Church architecture in Scotland incorporates all church building within the modern borders of Scotland, from the earliest Christian structures in the sixth century until the present day. The early Christian churches for which there is evidence are basic masonry-built constructions on the west coast and islands. As Christianity spread, local churches tended to remain much simpler than their English counterparts. By the eighth century more sophisticated ashlar block-built buildings began to be constructed. From the eleventh century, there were larger and more ornate Romanesque buildings, as with Dunfermline Abbey and St Magnus Cathedral in Orkney. From the twelfth century the introduction of new monastic orders led to a boom in ecclesiastical building, often using English and Continental forms. From the thirteenth century elements of the European Gothic style began to appear in Scotland, culminating in buildings such as Glasgow Cathedral and the rebuilt Melrose Abbey. Renaissance influences can be seen in a move to a low-massive style that was probably influenced by contacts with Italy and the Netherlands.

From the mid-sixteenth century the Reformation revolutionised church architecture in Scotland. It resulted in a rejection of the elaborate ornamentation of existing churches. New churches were produced in a plain style, often with a T-plan that emphasised the pulpit and preaching. This style was adopted by both Presbyterian and Episcopalian wings of the Scottish Kirk, but there were some attempts to introduce Baroque elements into church building after the Restoration. In the eighteenth century the influence of James Gibbs led to churches that employed classical elements, with a pedimented rectangular plan and often with a steeple. This classicism continued into the early nineteenth century, but became increasingly controversial and began to be rejected for a version of the Gothic Revival, which flourished into the early twentieth century. Between the world wars, a form of Neo-Romanesque became the norm for new churches. In the second half of the twentieth century new churches were highly influenced by Modernism, resulting in rectangular and irregularly shaped buildings, built in new materials, although many of these were later demolished. As the level of new building reduced from the 1970s there was a move to functional and unambitious new churches, but in the 1980s there was a move back to more striking and original designs.

== Middle Ages ==
=== Early churches ===
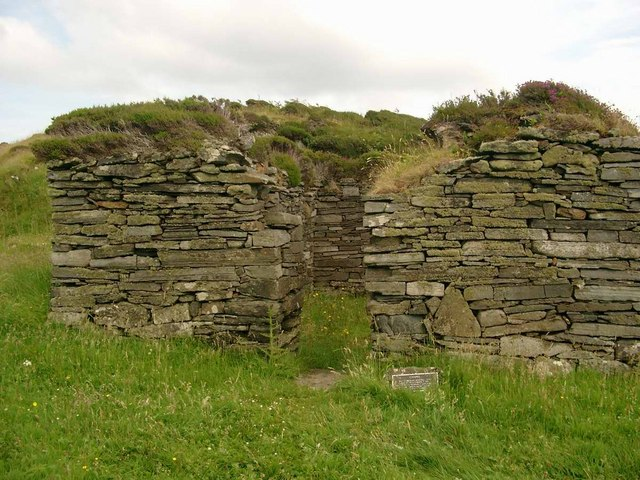
Remains of a chapel on Eileach an Naoimh

The introduction of Christianity into Scotland from Ireland from the sixth century led to the construction of the first churches. These may originally have been wooden, like that excavated at Whithorn, but most of those for which evidence survives from this era are basic masonry-built churches, beginning on the west coast and islands and spreading south and east. Early chapels tended to have square-ended converging walls, similar to Irish chapels of this period. Medieval parish church architecture in Scotland was typically much less elaborate than in England, with many churches remaining simple oblongs, without transepts and aisles, and often without towers. In the Highlands they were often even simpler, many built of rubble masonry and sometimes indistinguishable from the outside from houses or farm buildings.

Monasteries also differed significantly from those on the continent, and were often an isolated collection of wooden huts surrounded by a wall. At Eileach an Naoimh in the Inner Hebrides there are huts, a chapel, refectory, guest house, barns and other buildings. Most of these were of timber and wattle construction and probably thatched with heather and turves. They were later rebuilt in stone, with underground cells and circular "beehive" huts like those used in Ireland. Similar sites have been excavated on Bute, Orkney and Shetland. From the eighth century more sophisticated buildings emerged. The development of early ashlar masonry produced block-built stone buildings, like the eleventh century round tower at Brechin Cathedral and the square towers of Dunblane Cathedral and The Church of St Rule.

=== Romanesque ===
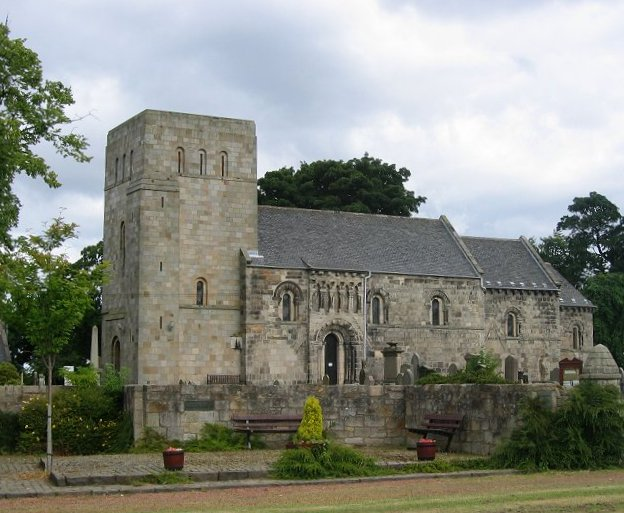
Dalmeny Kirk, one of the finest Romanesque churches in Scotland

After the eleventh century, as masonry techniques advanced, ashlar blocks became more rectangular, resulting in more stable walls that could incorporate refined architectural moulding and detailing that can be seen in corbelling, buttressing, lintels and arching. At the same time there was increasing influence from English and continental European designs, known as Romanesque. The Romanesque style had its origins in Roman building techniques and early churches in the Byzantine Empire and Italy and was characterised by massive reinforced walls and round arches that could bear the weight of rounded barrel vault roofs. The introduction of this style to Scotland is associated with the ecclesiastical reforms that began in the reign of Máel Coluim III (r. 1058–93), bringing continental ideas of monasticism and church organisation to the country. The oldest Romanesque church in Scotland is probably the small chapel built for Máel Coluim's wife Margaret on Castle Rock, Edinburgh, with a vaulted semi-circular apse. In the twelfth century a number of new parish churches were built by lords on their land. They were often small aisless buildings with two or three connected cells, each of diminishing size, ending in a rounded apse. One of the best preserved is at Dalmeny in Lothian.

St. Regulus Chapel at St. Andrews dates from around 1150 and was probably built as a reliquary church. Only the aisleless choir and tall square tower survive. Its detailing derives from work on a church at Wharram-le-Street in England and it may have been carried out by the same Yorkshire masons. The first monastic establishment built in the Romanesque style was Dunfermline Abbey, begun at the behest of Queen Margaret about 1074. An existing small chapel was expanded with a square choir and rounded apse. About fifty years later it was replaced by a grander cruciform church of which only the nave now survives. The chevron pattern in the detailing on the piers was modelled on that at Durham Cathedral. Similarly, St Magnus Cathedral in Orkney, begun in 1137, may have employed masons who had worked at Durham, with which it shares a similar pattern of great round arches based on thick cylindrical pillars. The arrival of the new monastic orders in Scotland from the twelfth century led to a boom in ecclesiastical building using English and continental forms, including abbeys at Kelso, Holyrood, St Andrews and Jedburgh, one of the most complete Romanesque buildings to survive.

=== Gothic ===
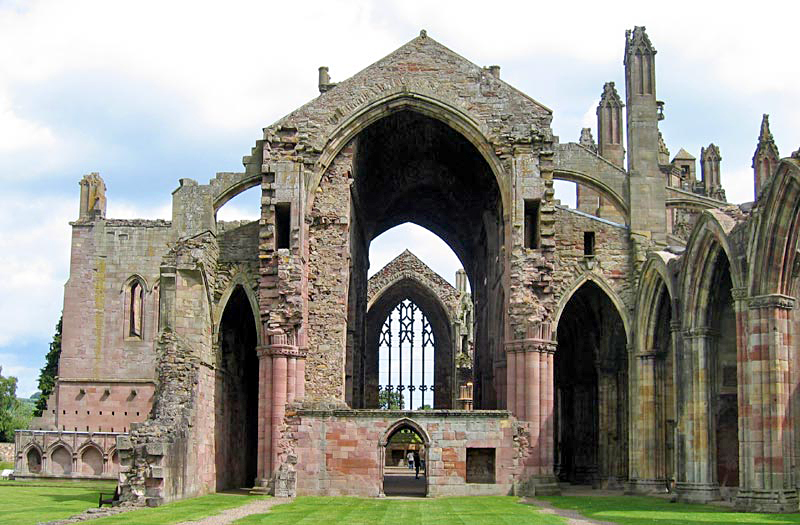
Melrose Abbey, one of the most elaborate Gothic buildings in Scotland

The style that developed from the Romanesque, originating in twelfth-century France, is now known as Gothic. It was characterised by pointed arches, ribbed vaults and flying buttresses. It was brought to Britain by the Cistercians, whose abbeys retained thick walls, but pierced them with lancet arches with slender pointed arches. This style became characteristic of the early Gothic in Britain and can be seen at Dundrennan Abbey, begun around 1142, which resembles religious foundations in northern England. The style can also be seen in the East end of Elgin Cathedral, which incorporated typical European Gothic mouldings and tracery. The best expression of the style is at Glasgow Cathedral, which elaborates Early English forms used at Lincoln and Rievaulx.

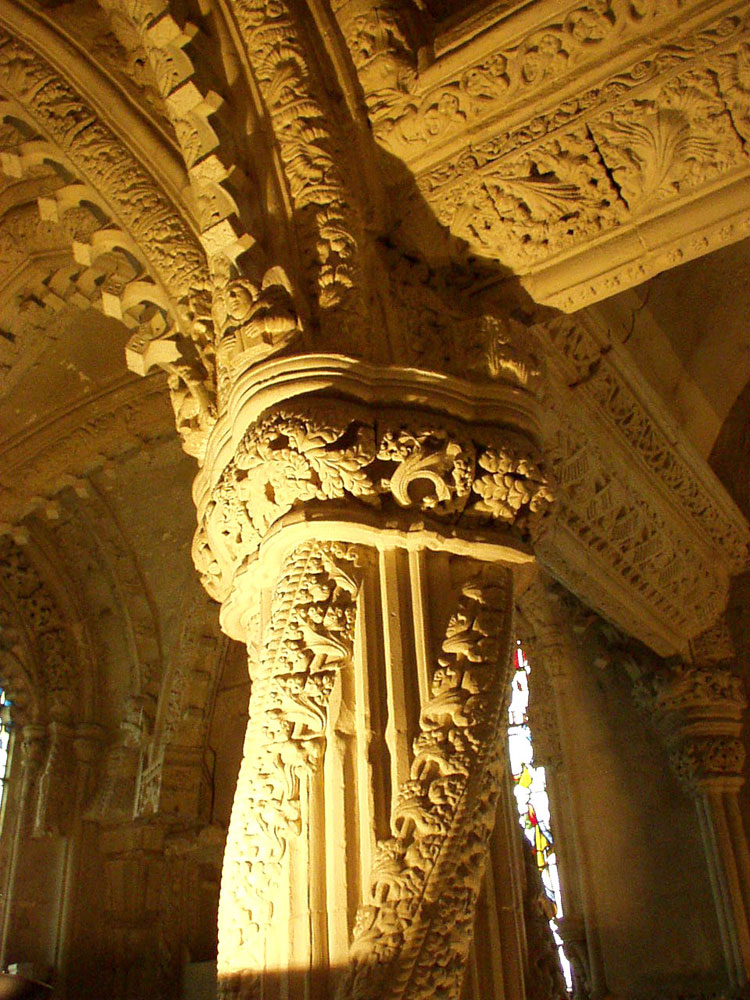
The Apprentice Pillar in Rosslyn Chapel, one of the most elaborate surviving examples of the late Gothic style

A more elaborate style known as Decorated Gothic, applying ornamentation to vaults and pillars, particularly using curved motifs, began to be adopted in the thirteenth century and was characteristic of Scottish church building in the fourteenth century. It was used at Dunblane Cathedral, built in the thirteenth century, particularly to decorate the nave and East end. At Fortrose in the Highlands the elaborate decoration of this style is still visible in the south aisle. One of the finest examples is Sweetheart Abbey near Dumfries, a Cistercian monastery, named after the burial of John de Balliol's heart alongside the body of his wife. The period of the Wars of Independence (1296–1357) saw a large number of ecclesiastical buildings ruined, including Melrose and Jedburgh Abbeys. Church building was largely confined to the parish churches in the relatively secure areas like Fife, as at St. Monans, originally a church of the Dominican friars.

In the fifteenth century, continental builders are known to have been working in Scotland. French master-mason John Morrow was employed at the building of Glasgow Cathedral and the rebuilding of Melrose Abbey, both considered fine examples of Gothic architecture. Compared with after the Reformation, the interiors of churches were often elaborate, with highly decorated sacrament houses, like the ones surviving at Deskford and Kinkell. The carvings at Rosslyn Chapel, depicting the progression of the seven deadly sins, were created in the mid-fifteenth century. They are considered some of the finest in the Gothic style. Late Medieval Scottish churches also often contained elaborate burial monuments, like the Douglas tombs in the town of Douglas.

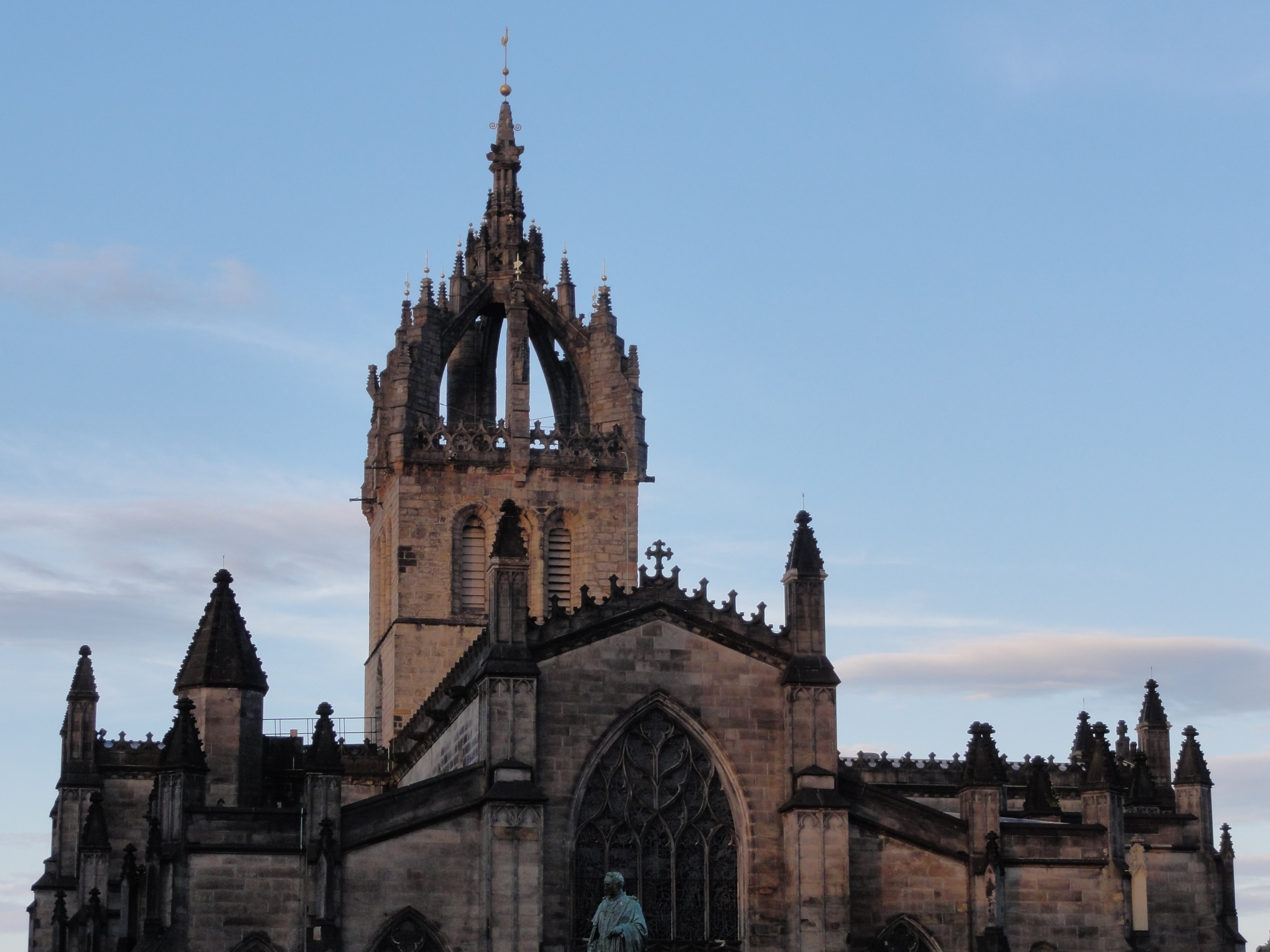
Crown steeple of St. Giles' Cathedral, Edinburgh

Late Gothic architecture in Scotland was very different to the Perpendicular style used in England, adopting a heavy form with rounded arches, and Flamboyant tracery of continental origin. It can be seen in the nave of Dunkeld Cathedral, begun in 1406, the façade of St Mary's, Haddington from the 1460s and in the chapel of Bishop Elphinstone's Kings College, Aberdeen (1500–09). About forty collegiate churches were established in Scotland in late fifteenth and early sixteenth centuries. Many, like Trinity College, Edinburgh, showed a combination of Gothic and Renaissance styles. The early sixteenth century saw crown steeples built on churches with royal connections, symbolising imperial monarchy, as at St. Giles Cathedral, Edinburgh.

== Early modern era ==
=== Reformation ===
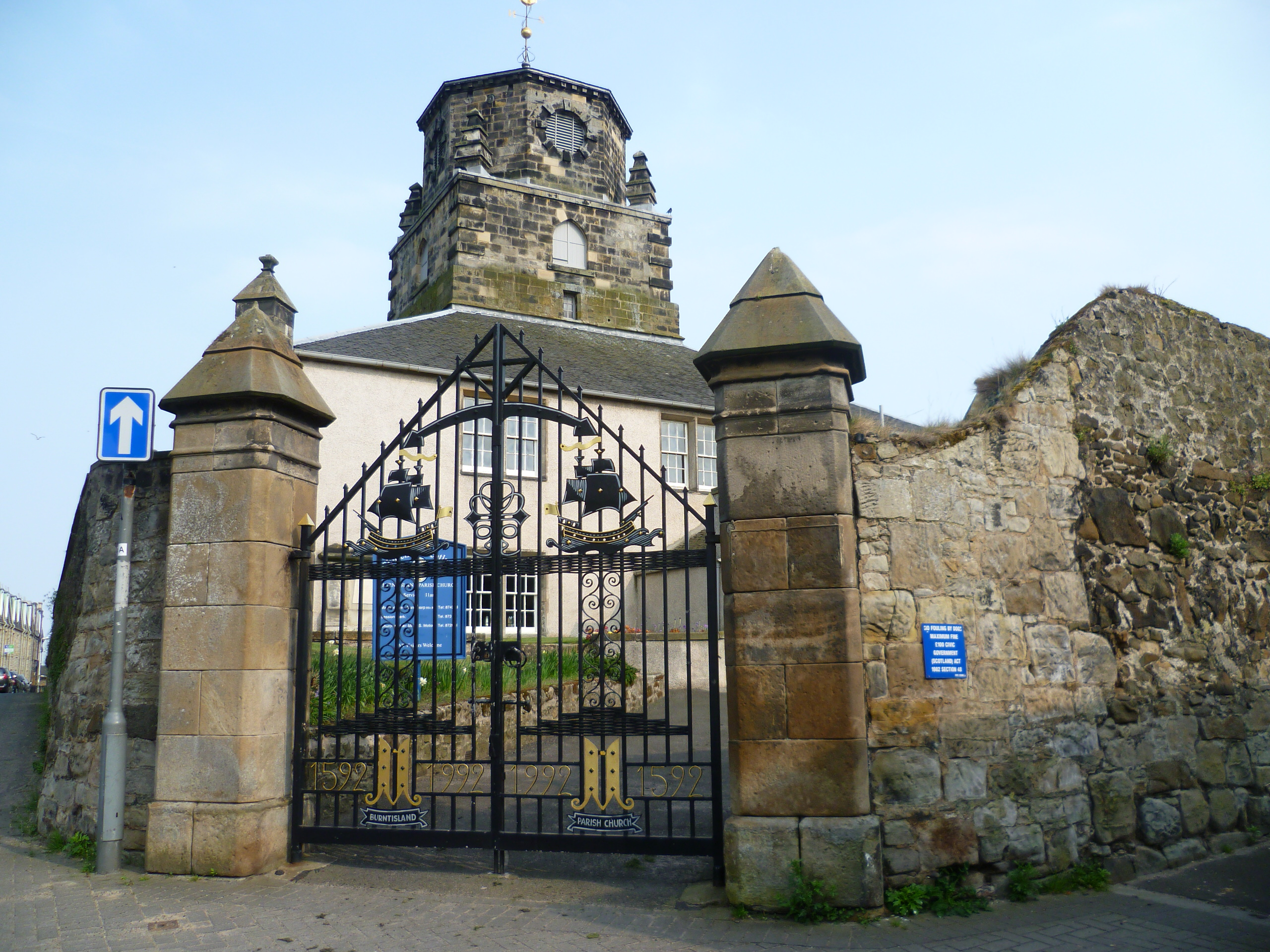
Burntisland Parish Kirk, its original wooden steeple now replaced by one of stone

From about 1560, the Reformation revolutionised church architecture in Scotland. Calvinists rejected ornamentation in places of worship. With no need for elaborate buildings divided up by ritual there was widespread destruction of Medieval church furnishings, ornaments and decoration. There was a need to adapt old buildings and build new churches suitable for reformed services, particularly by putting the pulpit and preaching at the centre of worship.

Many of the earliest buildings were simple gabled rectangles, a style that continued to be built into the seventeenth century. Examples include Dunnottar Castle in the 1580s, Greenock (1591) and Durness (1619), These new buildings often had windows on the south wall and none on the north, which became a unique feature of Reformation kirks. There were continuities with pre-Reformation materials, with some churches using rubble, as at Kemback in Fife (1582). Others employed stone and a few added wooden steeples, as at Burntisland (1592). The church of Greyfriars, Edinburgh, built between 1602 and 1620, used a rectangular layout with a largely Gothic form, but that at Dirleton (1612), had a more sophisticated classical style.

A variation of the rectangular church that developed in post-Reformation Scotland was the T-shaped plan, often used when adapting existing churches, which allowed the maximum number of parishioners to be near the pulpit. They can be seen at Kemback and Prestonpans after 1595. It continued to be used into the seventeenth century as at Weem (1600), Anstruther Easter, Fife (1634–44) and New Cumnock (1657). In the seventeenth century a Greek cross plan was used for churches such as Cawdor (1619) and Fenwick (1643). In most of these cases one arm of the cross would have been closed off as a laird's aisle, meaning that they were in effect T-plan churches. Larger churches often had a steeple, as at Tron Kirk, Edinburgh (1636–47).

=== Restoration ===
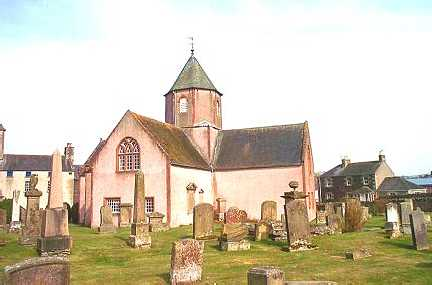
Lauder Church, built by Sir William Bruce in 1673 for the Duke of Lauderdale

By the later seventeenth century both the Presbyterian and episcopalian wings of the church had adopted the modestly sized and plain form of churches that had emerged after the Reformation. Most had a centralised plan with two or three arms, in a rectangular or T-planned arrangement. Steeples continued to be a major feature, either centrally on the long axis, or on an end gable, in as had been the case in pre-Reformation churches. As a result, there was little of the Baroque extravagance in church building seen on the Continent and England. Some minor innovations may indicate a move back toward episcopacy in the Restoration era. Lauder Church was built by Sir William Bruce in 1673 for the Duke of Lauderdale, who championed the bishops in the reign of Charles II and the Gothic windows of which may have emphasised antiquity, but its basic Greek cross plan remained within the common framework of new churches. The drive to episcopalian forms of worship may have resulted in more linear patterns, including rectangular plans with the pulpit on the end opposite the entrance. The major exceptions to the standard pattern are in the work of James Smith, who had become a Jesuit in his youth. These included the rebuilding of Holyrood Abbey undertaken for James VII in 1687, which was outfitted in an elaborate style. In 1691 Smith designed the mausoleum of Sir George Mackenzie of Rosehaugh, in Greyfriars Kirkyard, a circular structure modelled on the Tempietto di San Pietro in Montorio, designed by Donato Bramante (1444–1514). The Latin Cross form, increasingly popular in Counter Reformation Catholicism, was also used, as in Smith's Canongate Kirk (1688–90), but here it never saw episcopal service as the Presbyterian revolution of 1689–90 occurred before it was completed and the chancel was blocked up, making it, in effect, a T-plan.

=== Eighteenth-century Neo-Classicism ===
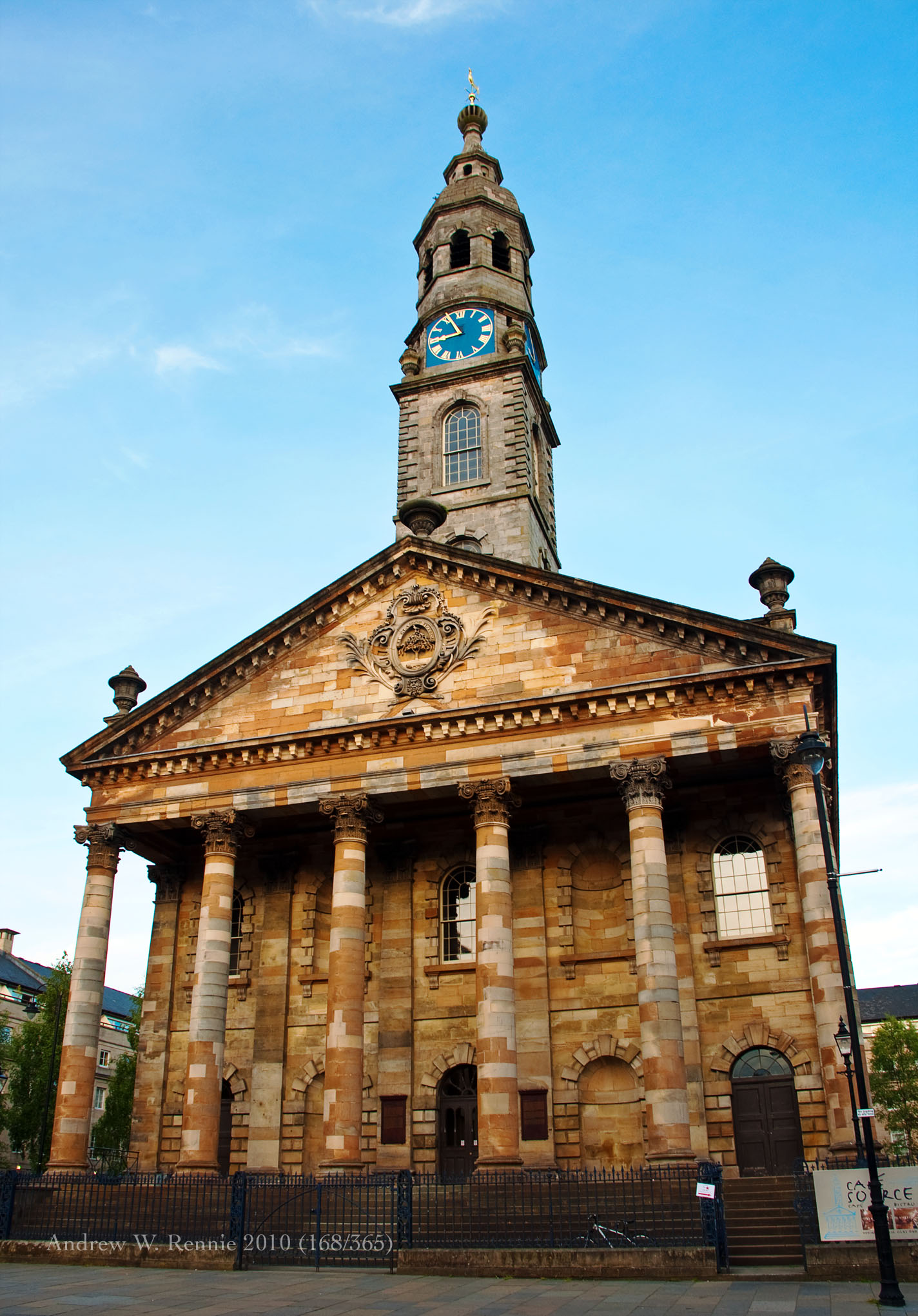
St Andrew's in the Square, Glasgow, one of the first Scottish churches influenced by James Gibbs

In the 18th century established patterns continued, with T-shaped churches with steeples on the long side, as at New Church, Dumfries (1724–27), and Newbattle Parish Church (1727–29). William Adam's Hamilton Parish Church (1729–32), was a Greek cross plan inscribed in a circle, while John Douglas's Killin Church (1744) was octagonal. Scots-born architect James Gibbs was highly influential on British ecclesiastical architecture. He introduced a consciously antique style in his rebuilding of St Martin-in-the-Fields, London, with a massive, steepled portico and rectangular, side-aisled plan. Similar patterns in Scotland can be seen at St Andrew's in the Square (1737–59), designed by Allan Dreghorn and built by the master mason Mungo Nasmyth, and at the smaller Donibristle Chapel (completed 1731), designed by Alexander McGill. Gibbs' own design for St. Nicholas West, Aberdeen (1752–55), had the same rectangular plan, with a nave-and-aisles, barrel-vaulted layout with superimposed pedimented front. After the Toleration Act 1711, episcopalians began building a limited number of new chapels including Alexander Jaffray's St Paul's chapel in Aberdeen (1721), the meeting house designed by McGill in Montrose, an Edinburgh chapel opened in 1722 and St Andrew's-by-the-Green in Glasgow (1750–52), which adopted a simpler version of Gibbs' pedimented rectangular plan.

In the second half of the 18th century, Scotland's rapidly expanding economy and population resulted in the laying out of numerous new towns and remodelled settlements, resulting in a need for new churches to support the local residents. These included St Andrew's and St George's West Church, George Street, in the New Town of Edinburgh, designed by Andrew Frazer (1782–87), followed in the tradition of Gibbs, with an oval plan, tetrastyle Corinthian portico and a tall steeple. The builder, Alexander Stevens, probably also designed the steeple of St Cuthbert's Church (1789–90). At Fochabers, from 1776 John Baxter redesigned the village on a grid plan, with a central square focused on Bellie Church (1795–97), still following in the tradition of Gibbs, with a tetrastyle portico and steeple.

== Nineteenth century ==
=== Neo-Classicial decline ===
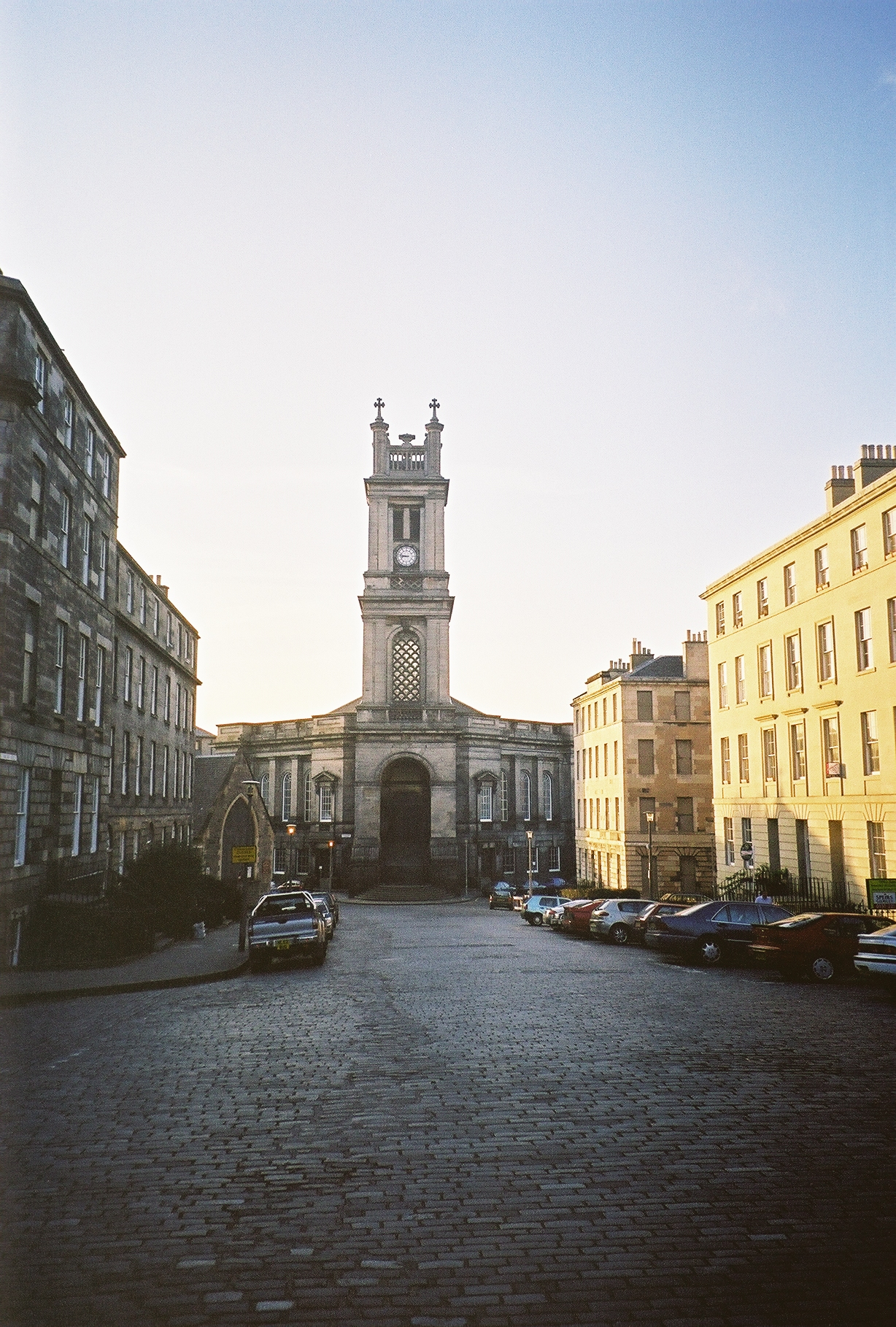
The Gracco-Baroque St Stephen's, Edinburgh

In the early nineteenth century the Gibbs-influenced steepled tradition continued, as can be seen in Robert Nisbet's Inveresk Church (1803–10). A Grecian form was developed at William Burn's North Leith Church (1813) and St John's Episcopal Church, Edinburgh (1816). The controversy over the style of the Scottish National Monument in 1816 led to the labelling of Greek temple motifs as "pagan" and relatively few columnar Greek churches were built after that in the capital. An exception was Archibald Elliot's Broughton Church (1820–21), which had a Doric temple front. More common in Edinburgh were churches that combined classical elements with other features, like the domed St George's, Charlotte Square (1811–14), executed by Robert Reid, or the Gracco-Baroque of William Playfair's St Stephen's (1827–28). In Glasgow there was a tradition of grafting porticoes on to existing meeting-houses, which continued in Gillespie Graham's West George Street Independent Church (1818), which was criticised as "popish", and John Baird I's Greyfriars United Secession Church (1821), which was fronted by a Roman Doric portico. Classical designs for the established Church included the redevelopment by William Stark of St George's-Tron Church (1807–08), David Hamilton's St Enoch's Parish Church (1827) and St Paul's Parish Church (1835).

=== Gothic Revival ===
As elsewhere in Western Europe, in the nineteenth century there was a return to Medieval styles, grouped together into a Gothic revival. Early examples included Adams' St George's Episcopal Chapel in Edinburgh (1792), which included octagonal lantern on ogival arches. Other examples included James Playfair's chapel-like Farnell Church (c. 1789) and Richard Crichton's towered Craig Parish Church (1799). In the early nineteenth century examples influenced by the English Perpendicular included Glenorchy Church (1810–11), built by the Earl of Breadalbane, John Paterson's octagonal reconstruction of St Paul's Church, Perth (c. 1800–07) and Fetteresso Church, Stonehaven (1810–12). Examples of a more explicitly perpendicular form can be seen in Gillespie Graham's Collace (1813), or David Hamilton's Old Erskine (1813–14).

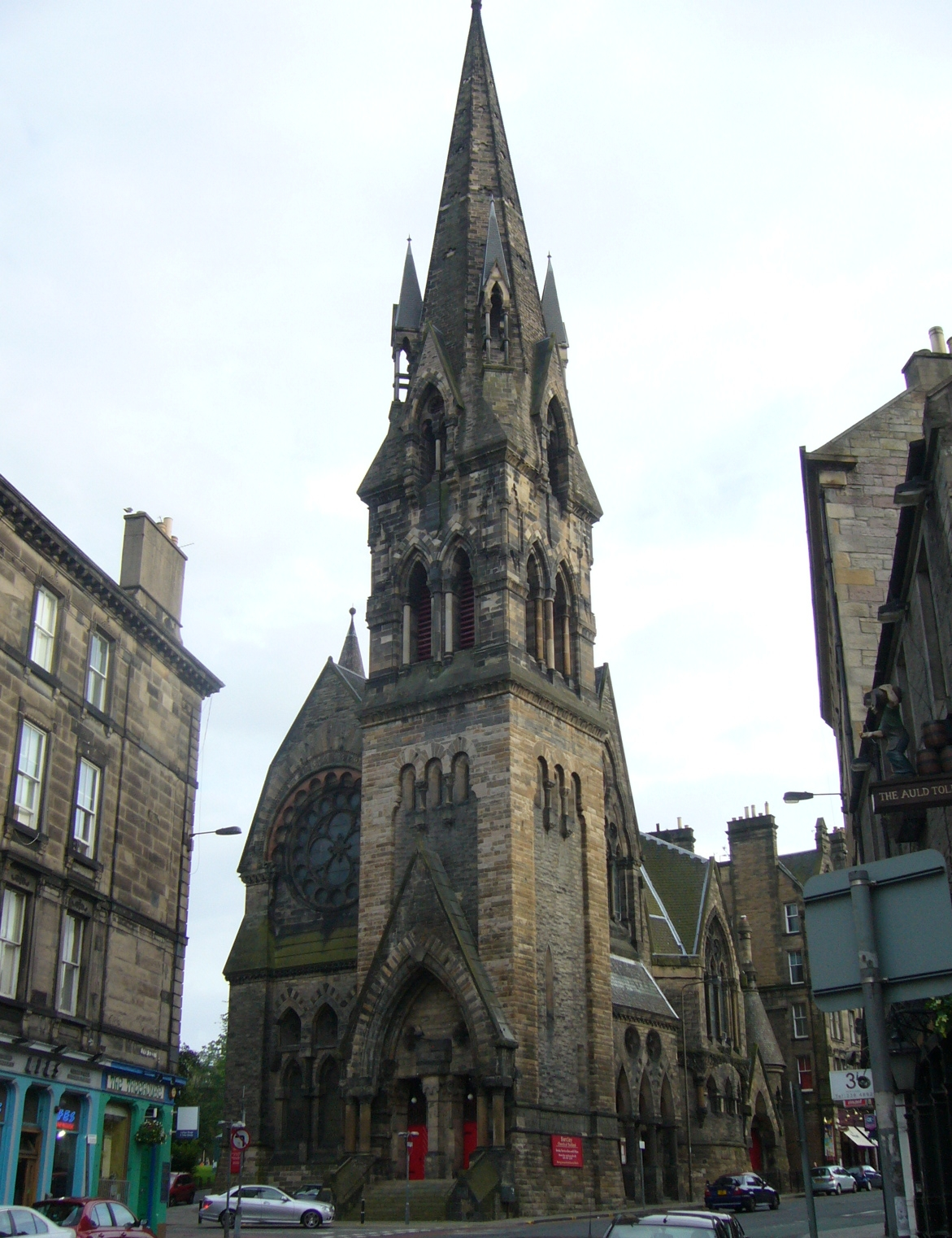
Barclay Viewforth Church, Edinburgh, built between 1862 and 1864 in the English Perpendicular style

As urban populations grew, major Neo-Gothic churches were built to accommodate them. After the passing of the Catholic Relief Act, James Gillespie Graham designed St Andrew's Roman Catholic Chapel in Glasgow (1814–17). There was also growth in the Episcopal Church, which benefited from the mainly Anglican migrant English workers. In Edinburgh these were modelled on the English Perpendicular, as at St Paul's York Place (1816–18), the towered St John's Chapel (1816–18) and St David's (Ramshorn) (1824–26). In Glasgow, the Ramshorn Kirk's has a T-plan and symmetrical front with tall tower.

The Kirk began to concern itself with providing churches in the new towns and relatively thinly supplied Highlands, establishing a church extension committee in 1828. Led by Thomas Chalmers, by the early 1840s it had added 222 churches, largely through public subscription. When the Great Disruption occurred in 1843, and roughly a third of ministers and their congregations left the established church and its buildings to form the Free Church of Scotland, Chalmers' organisational skills helped the Free Church build over 700 new places of worship by 1847. The established church took time to recover, but embarked on a rival programme of church building, increasing its number of parishes from 924 in 1843 to 1,437 by 1909. The intense competition between different denominations led to the creation of grand churches with tall steeples and ultimately resulted in an oversupply of churches, which would be a financial burden to future generations.

The intense competition for congregations also led to changes to make worship more attractive that were reflected in architecture. The Church of Scotland was among the first European Protestant churches to engage in liturgical innovation reflected in seating arrangements, abandoning box pews for open benches. From the middle of the nineteenth century some of its churches, like Greyfriars in Edinburgh, began installing organs and stained glass windows, reflecting an attempt to return to forms of worship largely excluded since the late seventeenth century. At Duns the church was rebuilt (opened 1888) in a plan used in the Middle Ages, with a separate chancel, communion table at the far end, and the pulpit under the chancel arch. The influence of the ecclesiological movement can be seen in churches built at Crathie (opened 1893), which had an apsidal chancel raised above the level of the nave, a stone pulpit and a brass lectern, and St. Cuthbert's, Edinburgh (rebuilt 1894), with a marble communion table in a chancel decorated with marble and mosaic.

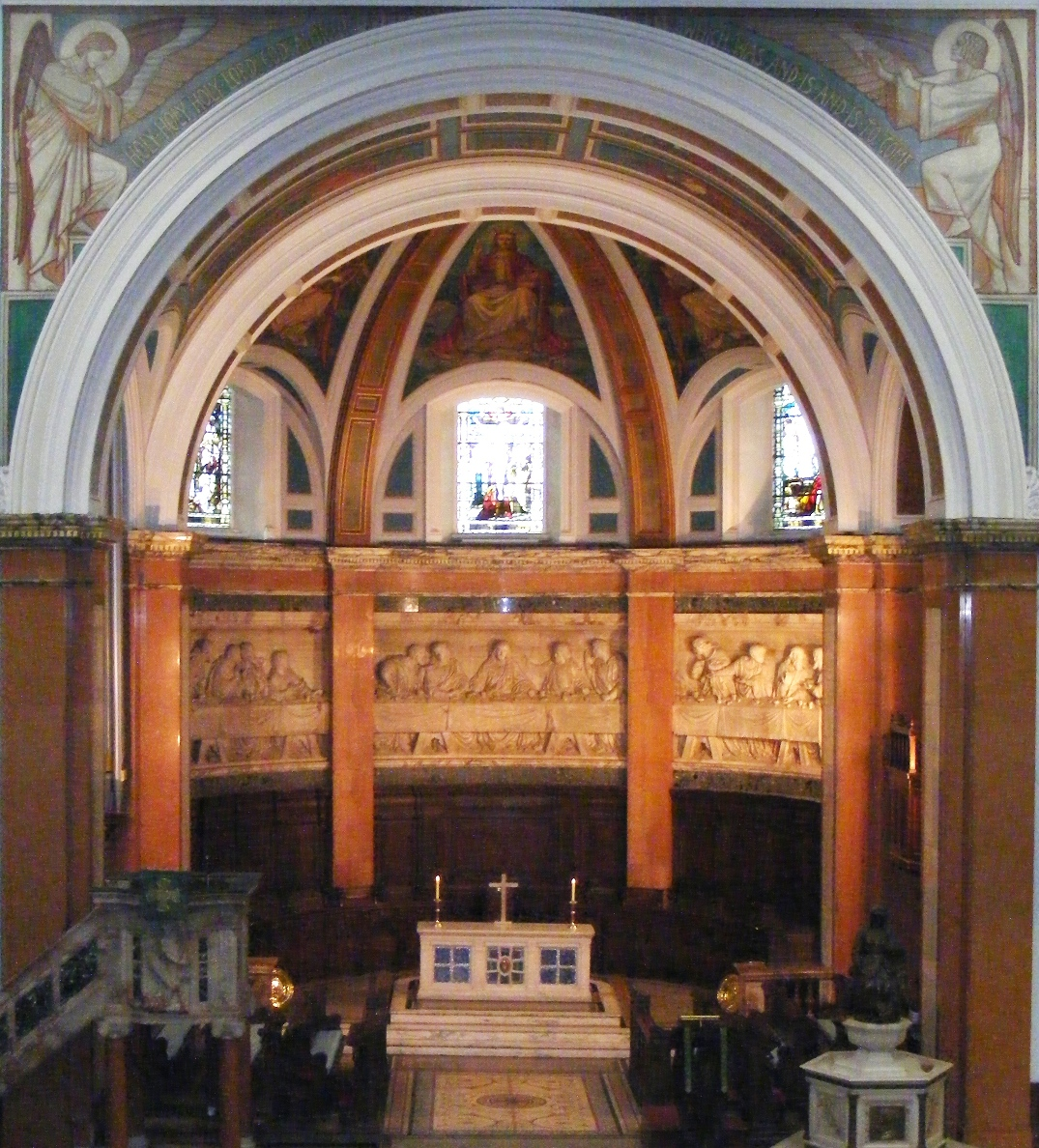
The interior of The Parish Church of St Cuthbert, Edinburgh, remodelled according to ecclesiological principles in 1894

A sub-set of the Medieval revival were Neo-Romanesque churches, often called "Norman" at the time, built in a style that incorporated Romanesque, Byzantine and Anglo-Saxon features within a low-massive framework. These were utilised by all the major denominations. Examples include the Church of Scotland buildings at Errol (1831–33); the Catholic St. Anthony's Chapel, Murthly (1845); McBridge Free Church, Rothsay (1845); and the Episcopalian St. Thomas, Rutland Place, Edinburgh (1842–43). Later nineteenth-century examples included the church at Strathbungo (1873), and St. Ninian's, Cathcart Road (1888), Glasgow, both designed by W. G. Rowan.

The Gothic style developed fully in the later nineteenth century. Important figures included Frederick Thomas Pilkington (1832–98), who adapted the Gothic style for the needs of the Free Church of Scotland, as at Barclay Viewforth Church, Edinburgh (1862–64). Robert Rowand Anderson (1834–1921), trained in the office of leading Gothic Architect George Gilbert Scott in London before returning to Edinburgh, where he worked on many small churches, including St James the Less in Leith, Christ Church, Falkirk (1862) and the Catholic Apostolic Church in Edinburgh (1876). He also supervised the renovation of Dunblane (1890–93) and Paisley Abbey (1898–1907). Alexander "Greek" Thomson (1817–75), working mainly in Glasgow, began in the Gothic style, but soon turned toward the ancient Greeks and Egyptians for inspiration, as can be seen in the temple and columns that were part of the Caledonia Road Church (1856). Scotland's most influential architect of the late nineteenth century and early twentieth century, Charles Rennie MacKintosh, designed a number of churches, but only one, Queen's Cross Free Church, Glasgow (1898–99) was built. It avoided the characteristic steeple of Glasgow churches in favour of a wide tower, and has a simple, elegant, rectangular structure with a single aisle.

== Twentieth century ==
=== Neo-Romanesque ===
In the first half of the twentieth century, there continued to be isolated examples of Gothic church building, including L. G. Thomson's Reid Memorial Church, Edinburgh (1929–33) and J. Taylor Thomson's St John Renfield Church, Glasgow (1927–31). The most common forms in this period were plain and massive Neo-Romanesque buildings. Protestant examples included H. O. Tarbolton's Bangour Village Church (1924–30) and L. G. Thomson's Fairmilehead Church (1937). Roman Catholic examples included Reginald Fairlie's Immaculate Conception Church, Fort William (1933–34), and Archibald Macpherson's St Matthew, Rosewell (completed 1926).

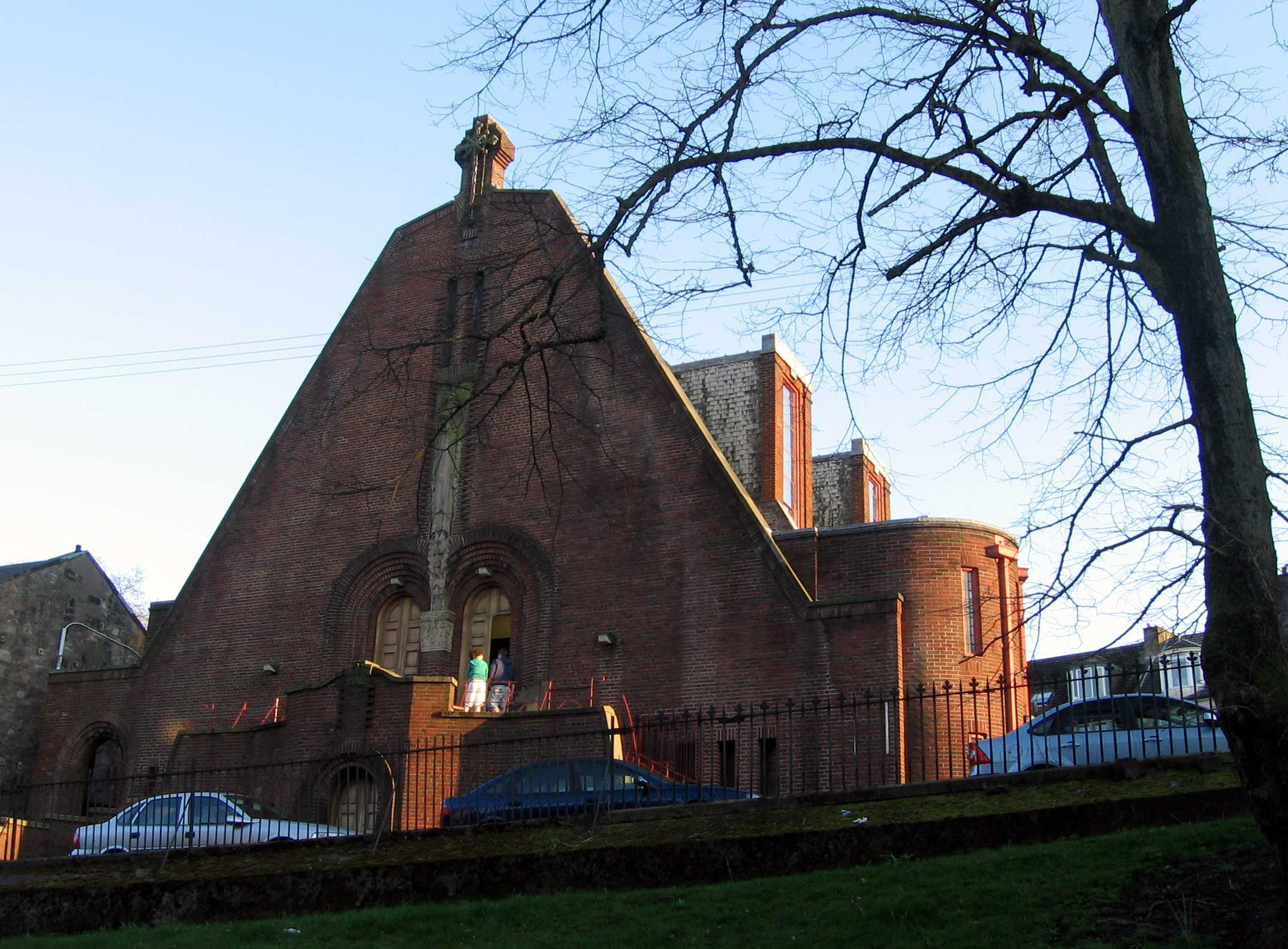
St. Patrick's Church, Orangefield in (1934–35) Greenock, one of Gillespie, Kidd & Coia pre-war brick-style architecture

The reunification of the Church of Scotland in 1929 removed much of the need for new Presbyterian church-building, which was replaced by a tendency towards renovating nineteenth-century churches, toning-down ritualistic furnishings; replacing dark varnish by white or neutral colour schemes. The main tendency in church design in the 1930s was a move towards classicism. There were isolated large classical Protestant commissions, such as Bristo Baptist Church, Edinburgh (1933–35), but the major buildings in this form were in the Catholic Church where there was a movement towards worshipper-centred basilican plans, after the pontificate of Pius X (1903–14). This movement reached its peak in the 1960s after the Second Vatican Council.

The leading figure in pursuing this style was Giacomo Antonio (Jack) Coia, who after the deaths of his partners, was the sole heir to the Glasgow-based practice of Gillespie, Kidd & Coia. From the later 1920s he pursued a brick style of Catholic architecture, pioneered by Macpherson in Edinburgh and combined with the classical tendencies of Fairlie's refacing of St Patrick's, Cowgate (1928–29). Coia's first church, St Anne's, Dennistoun (1931), utilised the engineering techniques of Beaux-Arts architecture, resulting in a broad, centralised space, with narrow arcades rather than aisles, with a monumental facade of red-brick. He used a more linear plan in subsequent designs, including St Patrick, Greenock (1934–35), St Columba, Maryhill (1937), and St Columbkille, Rutherglen (1934–40). The early Christian and Byzantine character of the most striking of these, St Patrick's, was enhanced by carvings by Archibald Dawson. Coia's use of selective details was probably indebted to Mackintosh. Later in the decade Coia took into partnership T. Warnett Kennedy. Kennedy's temporary, open-roofed Catholic chapel at the Empire Exhibition (1938) was fronted by a Mackintosh-like grid of metalwork, and with his St Peter in Chains Church, Ardrossan (1938), with austere walls and towers, showed the influence of the "abstract compositions" of contemporary Swedish architecture and pointed to the future influence of modernism.

=== Modernism and Post-Modernism ===
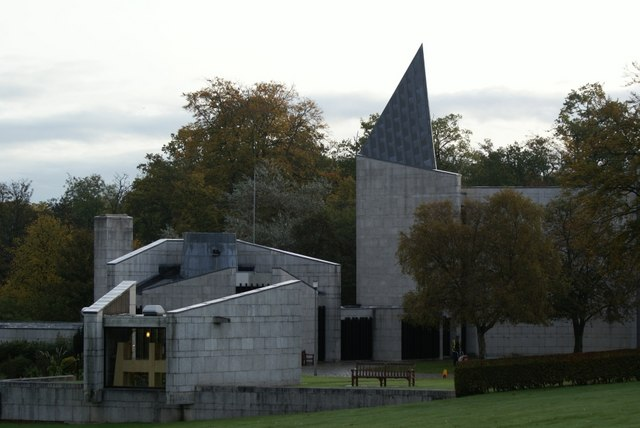
Mortonhall, Edinburgh, designed by Basil Spence

After the Second World War, there was another period of rapid church building, as the creation of new towns and council house estates necessitated the rapid supply of new churches. The austerity, shortage of materials and need for rapid building, discouraged the development of innovative design. This was accompanied by the rejection by most architects of traditional forms in favour of "international modernism", characterised by simple outlines, uncluttered internal spaces, absence of colour, and flat roofs.

The Catholic Church, whose traditional membership was most affected by the changes in housing, was the first to react to this situation, creating 76 new parishes between 1845 and 1960 in the west of the country alone. The Baptist and Episcopalian churches followed close behind, particularly in the new towns. Within the Church of Scotland, the closeness of congregation and clergy was expressed in the domestic plainness of 1950s dual-use hall churches, as at Reiach's Kildrum Parish Church, Cumbernauld (completed 1962), a steel framed building, clad in timber and brick with a flat roof. Of 129 buildings erected by the Church of Scotland between 1948 and 1959, 108 were on this basic pattern.

The influence of more radical Expressionism and Modernism can be seen in buildings such as Basil Spence's Mortonhall Crematorium, Edinburgh (1964–67), with a series of irregular chapels, with smooth-faced blockwork and Wheeler & Sproson's Boghall Church, Bathgate (1965), influenced by Beaux-Arts architecture. The pioneering contribution from the Church of Scotland was St. Columbia's, Glenrothes (1960), which had seating for the congregation on three sides of a central platform, with the choir and elders on the fourth side behind the pulpit.

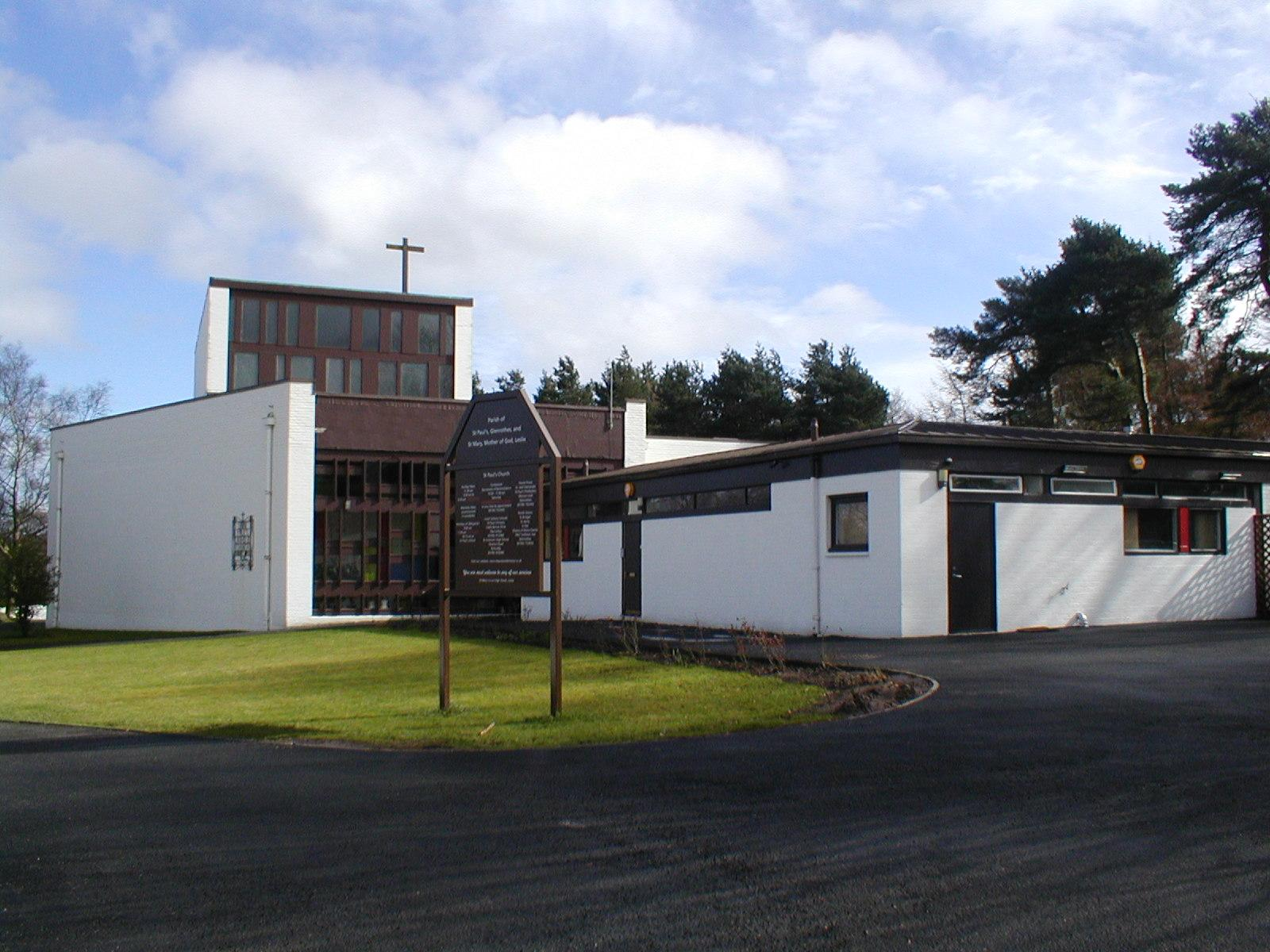
St. Paul's R.C. Church, Glenrothes, one of the first modernist churches produced by Gillespie, Kidd & Coia

In the Roman Catholic Church, the most important steps towards an expressionist design were under taken by Gillespie, Kidd & Coia. This began with St Paul's Church in the new town of Glenrothes (1956–57). This was a wedge-shaped construction of white-painted common brick focused on a dramatic, jagged metal cross by the sculptor Benno Schotz. From about 1960, all Gillespie, Kidd & Coia's churches were designed in this Late Modernist style, as at St Bride's, East Kilbride (1963–64), which had a rectangular plan. From the mid-1960s, they adopted a centralised, non-rectangular plan, with seating ranged round the altar, reflecting liturgical change. Sacred Heart Church, Cumbernauld (1964), was rectangular, of load-bearing brick, dramatically lit through dark coloured windows. Our Lady of Good Counsel, Dennistoun (1965) had a splayed plan and slanted ceiling. St Benedict Drumchapel (1965–67) had a prow-like roof on curved, laminated timbers. These innovative designs inspired others to experiment, including J. McCarron's Our Lady of Sorrows, South Uist (1964–65). However, many of these designs proved too radical and were later demolished by the Catholic Church, citing structural or maintenance problems.

The end of this phase of church-building, as the production of new housing subsided in the 1970s, saw a return to conservatism in church design, which may have reflected a loss of confidence in the churches as attendances rapidly declined. M. Glendinning, R. MacInnes and A. MacKechnie have identified a "post-Coia" style emerging in this period. The limited building, some replacing existing churches, tended to be by building companies using laminated timber beams, exposed brickwork and pyramidal roofs to produce utilitarian, if aesthetically unadventurous, constructions. From the late 1980s there were some original designs, including St Mary the Virgin, in Port Glasgow (1984) by Frank Burnet, Bell and Partners; St Anthony's Catholic church in Kirriemuir (1987), by James F. Stephen Architects; and the replacement church at St Joseph's Catholic Church, Faifley (1997) by Jacobsen and French. There was also the postmodern design of St John Ogilvie Catholic Church, Irvine (1982), and the nearby Girdle Toll parish church, converted from a farmhouse (1992).
