= Archibald Dawson =

Scottish sculptor

- Born: Archibald C. Dawson; 16 April 1892; Scotland
- Died: 15 April 1938 (aged 45); Scotland
- Known for: Sculpture
- Awards: Haldane Trust Award

Archibald C. Dawson ARSA (16 April 1892 – 15 April 1938) was a Scottish sculptor, specialising in architectural carving. Two of his most noteworthy works include wood and stone carvings for the University of Glasgow Memorial Chapel and sculptures for the Russell Institute in Paisley, featuring images of his wife and two sons.

== Personal life and career ==
He was born in Hamilton, South Lanarkshire at 23 High Partick Street.

Dawson's father, Mathew Dawson, was also an architectural carver who was in partnership with the Glasgow sculptor, James Milne Sherriff (1861–1904)

From 1911 to 1913 he attended the Glasgow School of Art and received the Haldane Trust Award. In his final year, he taught stone carving. Dawson then served during World War I in the Glasgow Battalion of the Highland Light Infantry.

From about 1920 to 1938, Dawson directed the design, modelling and stone carving classes at the Glasgow School of Art. Around 1926, Dawson taught a class in bronze casting in San Diego, California's Santa Barbara School of the Arts. He became the head of the Modelling and Sculpture and Ceramics Department in 1929. Dawson was in 1936 elected Associate of the Royal Scottish Academy. The same year he became a member of The Scottish Modern Arts Association. It was at about that time he also was a partner at Dawson & Young, after first working for James Young & Son.

He married Isabell (Isa) Wharrie Nelson on 3 July 1920. They had two sons, Alistair and Hamish. They lived first at 69 Minard Street and later at 56 Kelvingrove Street.

He died on 15 April 1938, the day before his St. Andrew figure was installed for the 1938 Empire Exhibition Scottish Pavilion, also the day before what would have been his 46th birthday. He is buried in the Glasgow Necropolis in an unmarked grave.

== Works ==
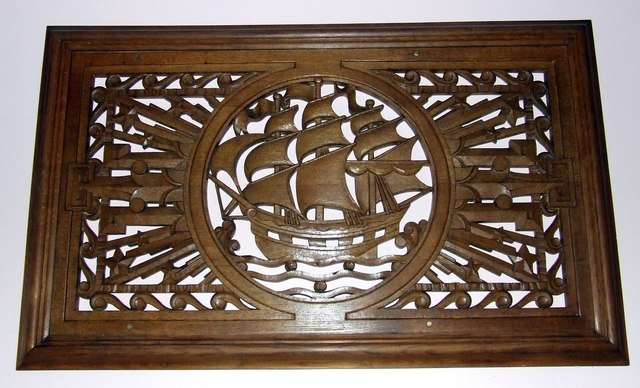
Wooden carving in Port Glasgow town hall. An adjacent plaque reads "These carvings were designed and crafted in 1936 by the head of Glasgow School of Sculpture, Archibald Dawson, as part of a church improvement scheme which was funded by the members of Newark Parish Church and Sir James Lithgow."

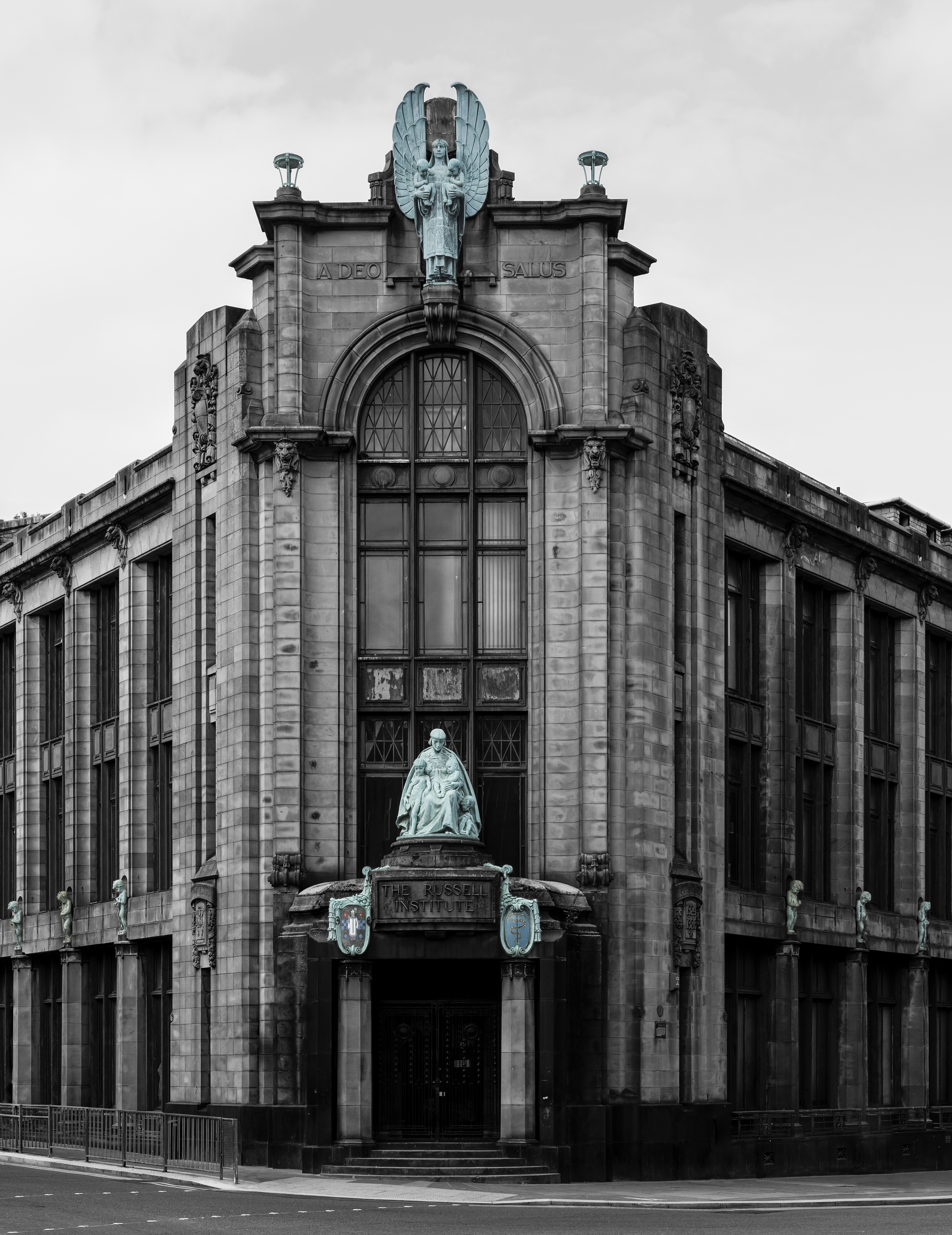
The Russell Institute features Dawson's sculptures

=== Notable works ===
One of his noteworthy works was the carving of stone and wood mouldings as designed by Sir John Burnett for Glasgow University's Memorial chapel, between 1923–1927. He worked on several churches by Jack Antonio Coia and the Ross Memorial Church in 1927.

He designed the panels depicting Industry, Prudence, Thrift and Courage for the Bothwell Street facade of Wright and Wylie's Scottish Legal Life Assurance Society building in Glasgow, completed in 1931.

Another important work was the Russell Institute in Paisley, Scotland where he created between 1927 and 1929 groups and figures in bronze and other materials. His wife and two sons were models for the large sculpture over the entrance.

As well as his works for churches, Dawson also created the following works in Glasgow:

- 1927–1931 – Scottish Legal Life Building reliefs and heraldry
- A statue of St. Andrew that is on the exterior of what was the North British & Mercantile Building, now the Sun Alliance building. Dawson and his wife were added about 1952 by Jack Mortimer. The Dawsons represented the Seafarer and Seafarer's wife.
- 1928–1929 – Industry and Shipbuilding figures on the Mercat Building
- 1928–1929 – Mercat Cross at Glasgow Cross
- 1930 – Heraldic Unicorn, Margaret Findlay was his model for the work.
- 1933–1935 – Tennent Memorial Building
- Sculpture for other commercial buildings.
- 1938 – St Peter in Chains, Ardrossan, Ayrshire, The Stations of the Cross. Church built in 1938 by Jack Coia, Category A listed building.

His final work, created in 1938, was St. Andrew as a Young Man for the Empire Exhibition's Scottish Pavilion in Bellahouston. Due to his sudden death, the work became his memorial during the Empire Exhibition.

=== Other works ===
The following is a partial list of Dawson's works

- Head of a child
- The mask
- Mother and child
- 1915 – Youth
- 1919 – Portrait Study of Miss Nelson
- 1923 – Ophelia
- 1923 – Portrait of Miss Betty Liddell
- 1924 – Kelpie
- 1924 – Mark for black marble
- 1925 – Benje
- 1933 – Jack Antonio Coia, ARIBA
- 1934 – Portrait
- 1935 – Miss Margot Gardner
- 1936 – Hamish Dawson Davidson
- 1936 – Sketch for a garden
- 1936 – Helen Elizabeth Anne Hutchison
- 1937 – Viscount Andover
- 1937 – James Campbell Semple
- 1937 – The artist's wife
- 1938 – Helen Elizabeth Anne
- 1938 – Moyra Mainds

== Exhibitions ==
Dawson exhibited his work many times from 1915 to 1939:

- The Exhibition of the Royal Scottish Academy of Painting, Sculpture and Architecture: 1924, 1925, 1933, 1934, 1935, 1936, 1937, 1938, 1939
- The Royal Glasgow Institute of the Fine Arts: 1915, 1919, 1923
- Palace of Arts Empire Exhibition Scotland: 1938
