= Fenland Airfield =

Airfield in Lincolnshire, England

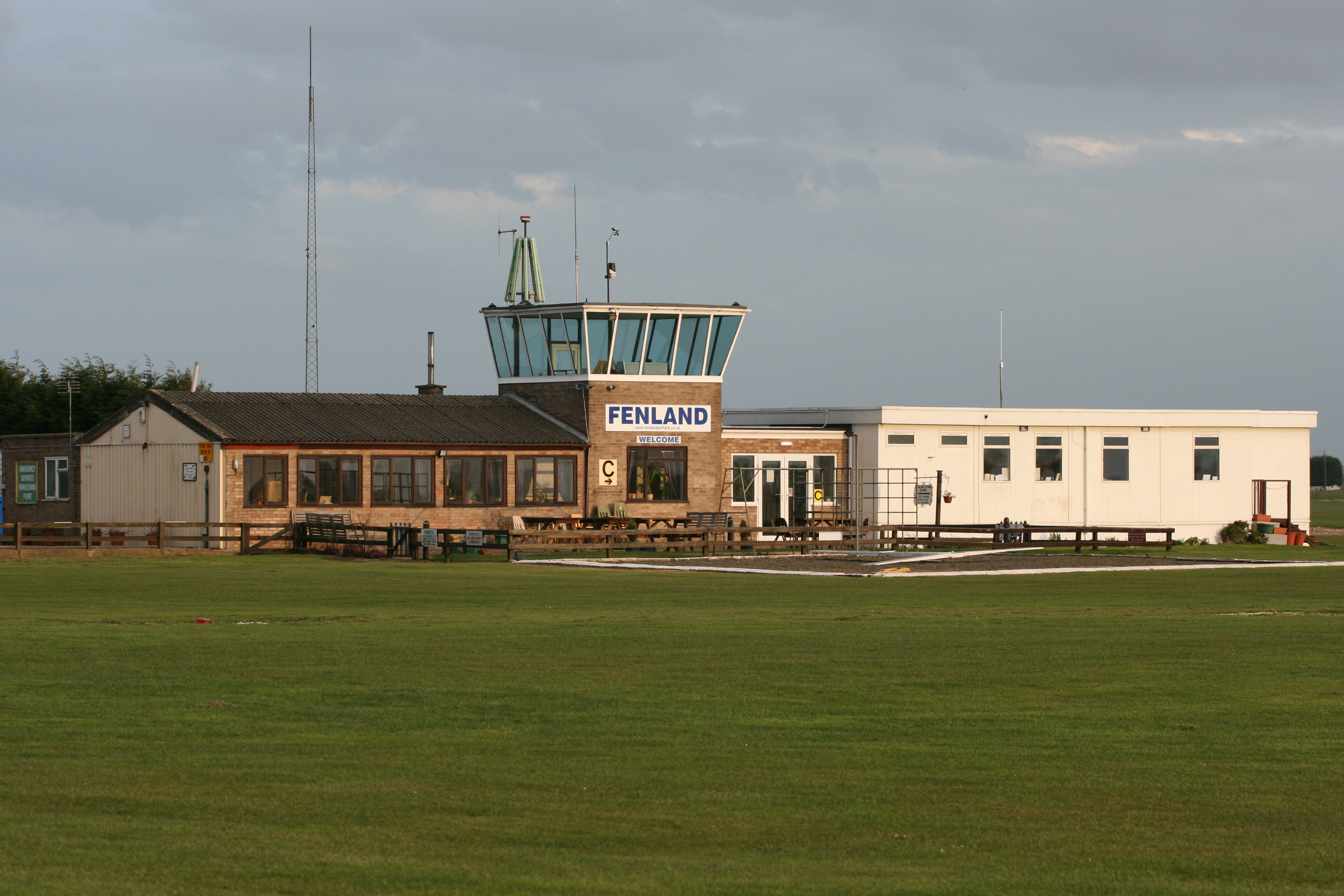
- Fenland Airfield control tower, with adjoining clubhouse, pilot briefing and ground school facilities
- IATA: none; ICAO: EGCL

Summary
- Airport type: Public
- Operator: Fenland Aero Club
- Location: Holbeach St Johns, Lincolnshire, England
- Elevation AMSL: 6 ft / 2 m
- Coordinates: 52°44′22″N 000°01′48″W
- Website: www.fenlandairfield.co.uk; www.fenland-flying-school.co.uk

Map
- Location in Lincolnshire

Runways
Direction	Length		Surface
Direction	m	ft	Surface
18/36 (licensed)	600	1,969	Grass
08/26 (unlicensed)	670	2,198	Grass
- Sources: UK AIP at NATS

Fenland Airfield or Fenland Aerodrome (ICAO: EGCL) is located 6 nautical miles (11 km; 6.9 mi) southeast of the town Spalding near the small village of Holbeach St Johns in Lincolnshire, England.

Fenland Aerodrome provides general aviation operations and is a UK Civil Aviation Authority licensed aerodrome. This permits the airfield to be used for take-off and landing of aircraft engaged in flights for public transport of passengers, including for instruction in flying which is conducted by Fenland Flying School. The aerodrome operates on a non-PPR (Prior Permission Required) basis, except for non-radio flights and aircraft requiring Jet A-1 fuel.

== Airfield facilities ==
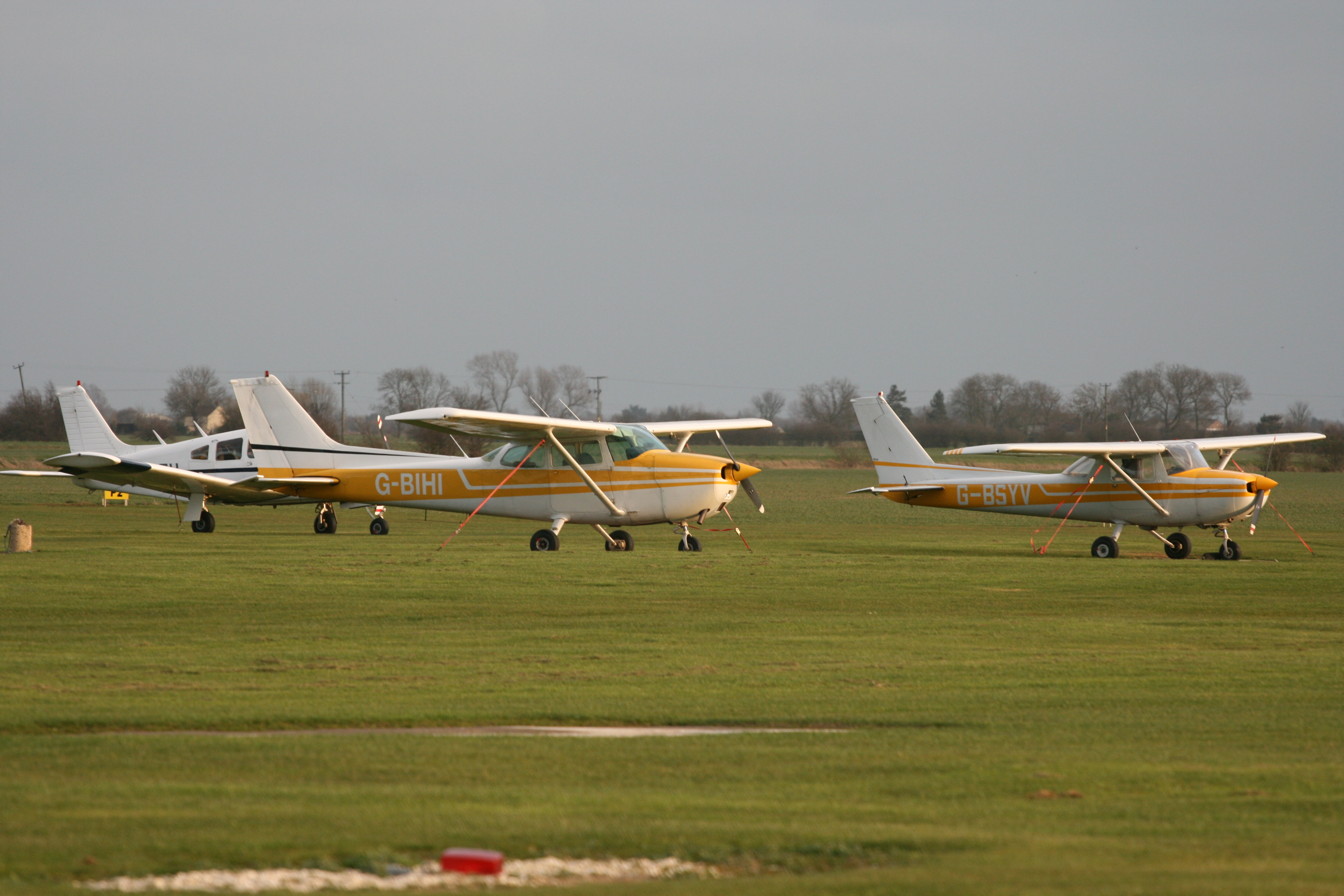
Two Cessna aircraft (type Cessna 172M Skyhawk and a Cessna 150M) and in the far distance a Piper PA-28 Cherokee Arrow aircraft parked at Fenland Airfield, March 2008.

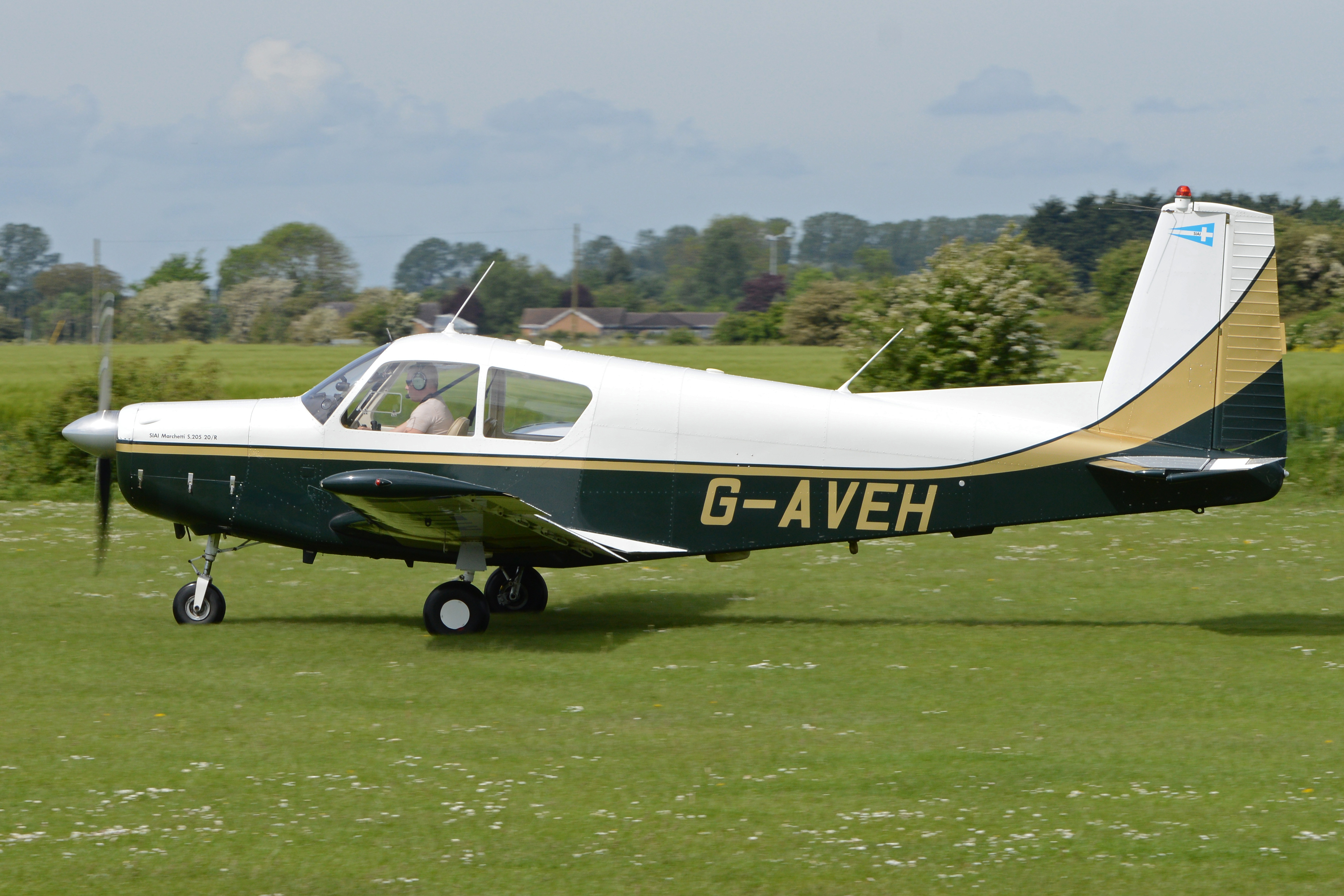
SIAI-Marchetti S.205-20/R aircraft taxiing on the grass runway at Fenland Airfield, May 2017.

The airfield provides a wide range of facilities for pilots and pilot students from throughout Lincolnshire and its neighbouring counties Norfolk and Cambridgeshire, including a restaurant service, aircraft and helicopter refueling for 'fly-in' visitors, aircraft charter, and aircraft maintenance services by licensed onsite aircraft maintenance and avionics technicians. Pilot flight training is conducted in the school's own fleet of United Kingdom (G) registered light aircraft, consisting of types Cessna 152, Cessna 172 Skyhawk's, Robin DR360 Chevalier and a SIAI-Marchetti S.205-20/R, including a ground school solo flight simulator.

Annually the aerodrome also stages various public air display shows and other public events around aviation. The aerodrome is also close to RAF Holbeach Air Weapons Range located along the Lincolnshire coastline on The Wash.

== See also ==
- General aviation in the United Kingdom
- List of general aviation activities
- Private pilot
- Pilot licensing and certification
- Pilot licensing in the United Kingdom
