= List of shipwrecks in February 1836 =

The list of shipwrecks in February 1836 includes ships sunk, foundered, wrecked, grounded, or otherwise lost during February 1836.

== 1 February ==
List of shipwrecks: 1 February 1836
Ship	State	Description
Concordia	United Kingdom	The ship was driven ashore on Lavenock Point, Glamorgan. She was on a voyage from Cardiff, Glamorgan to Glasgow, Renfrewshire. Concordia was later refloated and returned to Cardiff.
Irene	United Kingdom	The ship was driven ashore near Irvine, Ayrshire.
Lady of the Lake	United Kingdom	The steamship was abandoned in the River Tees. She subsequently drifted out into the North Sea.
Thomas	United Kingdom	The ship was driven ashore at Maryport, Cumberland.
Thomas Tyson	United Kingdom	The ship was driven ashore at Maryport. She was on a voyage from Dublin to Maryport.

== 2 February ==
List of shipwrecks: 2 February 1836
Ship	State	Description
Ann	United Kingdom	The ship was driven ashore at Whitehaven, Cumberland. Her crew were rescued. She was on a voyage from the Isle of Man to Whitehaven.
Bon Père	France	The ship was driven ashore and wrecked near "Coquete", Finistère.
Calstock	United Kingdom	The ship departed from Swansea, Glamorgan for Plymouth, Devon. No further trace, presumed foundered with the loss of all hands.
Cassilis	United Kingdom	The ship was driven ashore in Troon Bay. She was on a voyage from Belfast, County Antrim to Workington, Cumberland.
Maria	United Kingdom	The ship was driven ashore near Port Patrick, Wigtownshire. She was on a voyage from Belfast to Maryport, Cumberland.
Nymph	United Kingdom	The ship was abandoned in the North Sea and foundered. Her crew were rescued.
Oak Packet	United Kingdom	The ship was wrecked on Scroby Sands, Norfolk with the loss of a crew member. She was on a voyage from Scarborough, North Yorkshire to London. She was beached at Winterton-on-Sea, Norfolk in a capsized state on 4 February and was subsequently wrecked.
Ruby	United Kingdom	The ship was lost east of Dungeness, Kent. Her crew were rescued. She was on a voyage from Sunderland, County Durham to Southampton, Hampshire.
Thomas	United Kingdom	The ship was driven ashore near Ravenglass, Cumberland.
Two Sisters	United Kingdom	The ship was driven ashore near Saltfleet, Lincolnshire. Her crew were rescued.
Webster	United Kingdom	The ship departed from Swansea for Plymouth. No further trace, presumed foundered with the loss of all hands.

== 3 February ==
List of shipwrecks: 3 February 1836
Ship	State	Description
Ann	United Kingdom	The schooner was driven ashore and wrecked at Sunderland, County Durham. Her crew were rescued by the Sunderland Lifeboat.
Ann and Elizabeth	United Kingdom	The ship was driven ashore and damaged at Bangor, Caernarvonshire.
Clementina	United Kingdom	The ship sprang a leak and was beached at Dublin.
Clementson	United Kingdom	The ship was driven ashore at Hoylake, Lancashire. She was on a voyage from Demerara to Liverpool, Lancashire.
David Richards	United Kingdom	The ship was driven ashore and wrecked at Lowestoft, Suffolk. Her crew were rescued by the Lowestoft Lifeboat.
Defiance	United Kingdom	The ship was wrecked near Ulverston, Lancashire. Her crew were rescued. She was on a voyage from St. Domingo to Liverpool.
Fanny	United Kingdom	The ship was wrecked near St. Ives, Cornwall with the loss of all hands.
Gondola	United Kingdom	The ship was driven ashore at Hoylake. She was on a voyage from Darien, Georgia, United States to Liverpool. Gondola was refloated on 4 February.
Jane Kay	United Kingdom	The collier was wrecked on the Barnard Sand, in the North Sea off the coast of Suffolk with the loss of all hands. She was on a voyage from Stockton-on-Tees, County Durham to London.
Jean and Mary	United Kingdom	The ship was wrecked on a sandbank in Liverpool Bay with the loss of several of her crew.
John	United Kingdom	The ship was driven ashore and wrecked at Lowestoft.
Louisa	United Kingdom	The ship was driven ashore and wrecked at Pakefield. Her crew were rescued.
Monongahela	United Kingdom	The ship was driven ashore on Pea Patch Island Delaware. She was later refloated and taken in to Philadelphia, Pennsylvania.
Rebecca	United Kingdom	The ship ran aground on the Leven Sand, in the Irish Sea off the coast of Anglesey. She was on a voyage from Liverpool to Demerara. She was refloated the next day and taken in to Beaumaris, Anglesey.
Robert	United Kingdom	The ship was driven ashore at Hoylake. She was on a voyage from Calcutta, India to Liverpool.
Ruby	United Kingdom	The ship was driven ashore and damaged at Sunderland. She was later refloated and taken in to Sunderland.
Speedwell	United Kingdom	The collier was wrecked on the Barnard Sand with the loss of all hands.
St. Patrick	United Kingdom	The ship ran aground on Buck's Bank, in the New Channel, sprang a leak and was abandoned. She was on a voyage from Saint John, New Brunswick, British North America to Liverpool. St. Patrick was subsequently driven ashore at Hoylake.
Thomas	United Kingdom	The ship foundered in the Irish Sea off Ravenglass, Cumberland.
Winscales	United Kingdom	The ship was driven ashore at Hoylake. She was on a voyage from Calcutta to Liverpool. Winscales was refloated on 4 February.
Wellington	United Kingdom	The ship was wrecked on the Barnard Sand with the loss of all but one of her crew.

== 4 February ==
List of shipwrecks: 4 February 1836
Ship	State	Description
Barrowgate	United Kingdom	The ship was on the Whittaker Spit, in the North Sea off the coast of Essex. Her crew were rescued by Beulah (United Kingdom).
Despatch	United Kingdom	The ship was wrecked at the entrance to the Water of Urr with the loss of all hands.
Dunn	United Kingdom	The ship struck the South Gare, in the North Sea and foundered. Her crew were rescued. She was later refloated.
Earl Grey	United Kingdom	The collier ran aground on the Whittaker Spit and was abandoned by her crew, who were rescued by Mary Ann (United Kingdom). Earl Grey was later refloated and taken in to Sheerness, Kent in a severely damaged condition.
Fame	United Kingdom	The ship foundered in the Atlantic Ocean 5 leagues (15 nautical miles (28 km)) off the Isles of Scilly. Her crew survived. She was on a voyage from Newport, Monmouthshire to Newcastle upon Tyne, Northumberland.
Sarah	United Kingdom	The collier was wrecked on the Whittaker Spit. Her crew were rescued by Lord Howe (United Kingdom). Sarah was on a voyage from Newcastle upon Tyne to London.

== 5 February ==
List of shipwrecks: 5 February 1836
Ship	State	Description
Eliza	Netherlands	The ship ran aground on the Goodwin Sands, Kent, United Kingdom with the loss of four of her twelve crew. She was on a voyage from Rotterdam, South Holland to Batavia, Netherlands East Indies. Eliza was refloated on 6 February and taken in to Ramsgate, Kent.
Henrietta	(United Kingdom of Great Britain and Ireland) British North America	The ship was driven ashore near Wicklow.
James	United Kingdom	The ship struck the Newcombe Sand, in the North Sea off the coast of Norfolk and was damaged. She subsequently came ashore at Great Yarmouth, Norfolk.
Kitty	United Kingdom	The ship was abandoned off The Lizard, Cornwall. Her crew were rescued by Catharine (United Kingdom). Kitty was on a voyage from Neath, Glamorgan to Plymouth, Devon.
Lavinia	United Kingdom	The ship was lost near Wivenhoe, Essex.
HMS Pike	Royal Navy	The schooner was wrecked off Old Harbour, Jamaica. Her crew were rescued.
Regulator	United States	The ship was lost near Plymouth, Massachusetts with the loss of five of her crew. She was on a voyage from Smyrna, Ottoman Empire to Boston, Massachusetts.

== 6 February ==
List of shipwrecks: 6 February 1836
Ship	State	Description
Anne	(United Kingdom of Great Britain and Ireland) British North America	The ship was lost near the Quoddy Lighthouse, Maine, United States.
Bombastes Furioso	United Kingdom	The ship foundered in the North Sea with the loss of all hands.
Brothers	United Kingdom	The ship sprang a leak and was beached in Mount's Bay, where she was wrecked. She was on a voyage from Newport, Monmouthshire to Salcombe, Devon.
Conceit	United Kingdom	The ship foundered in the North Sea with the loss of all hands.
Grist	United Kingdom	The ship was driven ashore at Shotley, Suffolk.
Hibernia	United Kingdom	The ship caught fire at Liverpool, Lancashire and was scuttled.
Nimrod	United Kingdom	The ship was driven ashore and wrecked at Nacton, Suffolk with the loss of most of her crew.
Popinjay	United Kingdom	The ship collided with Quo Warranto (United Kingdom) and foundered in the North Sea.
Queen of the Netherlands	United Kingdom	The ship was lost near Hellevoetsluis, South Holland, Netherlands. All on board were rescued. She was on a voyage from London to Rotterdam, South Holland.
Speedwell	United Kingdom	The ship was wrecked on the Barnard Sand with the loss of all but one of her crew.

== 7 February ==
List of shipwrecks: 7 February 1836
Ship	State	Description
Lovely	United Kingdom	The ship was driven ashore and wrecked at Bideford, Devon. Her crew were rescued by the Bideford Lifeboat. She was on a voyage from Cardigan to Newport, Monmouthshire.

== 8 February ==
List of shipwrecks: 8 February 1836
Ship	State	Description
Margaret Oakley	United States	The ship was sighted off the Île de France whilst on a voyage from Canton, China to New York. No further trace, presumed foundered with the loss of all hands.

== 9 February ==
List of shipwrecks: 9 February 1836
Ship	State	Description
Concordia	United Kingdom	The ship ran aground at Swanwick Point, Glamorgan. She was on a voyage from Cardiff, Glamorgan to Glasgow, Renfrewshire. Concordia was later refloated and taken in to Cardiff.
James and Edward	United Kingdom	The ship collided with Earl of Hopetown (United Kingdom) and foundered in the North Sea off Flamborough Head, Yorkshire. Her crew were rescued. She was on a voyage from Newcastle upon Tyne, Northumberland to Plymouth, Devon.

== 10 February ==
List of shipwrecks: 10 February 1836
Ship	State	Description
Margaret	United Kingdom	The ship was driven ashore at Scarborough, Yorkshire. She was on a voyage from Woodbridge, Suffolk to Newcastle upon Tyne, Northumberland. Margaret was refloated on 15 February and taken in to Scarborough.
Superb	United Kingdom	The ship was driven ashore in Loch Indaal.
Susanna	United Kingdom	The ship sprang a leak and was beached near St. Michael's Mount, Cornwall. She was on a voyage from Truro, Cornwall to Swansea, Glamorgan.

== 11 February ==
List of shipwrecks: 11 February 1836
Ship	State	Description
Margaret	United Kingdom	The ship was driven ashore south of Whitby, Yorkshire. She was on a voyage from Woodbridge, Suffolk to Newcastle upon Tyne, Northumberland.
Marietta	United Kingdom	The ship was wrecked on the Black Rock, off Galway. She was on a voyage from Cardigan to Cork.

== 12 February ==
List of shipwrecks: 12 February 1836
Ship	State	Description
John	United Kingdom	The ship foundered in the English Channel off Dungeness, Kent. Her crew were rescued. She was on a voyage from Limerick to London. John was refloated on 15 February and taken in tow, but foundered off Sandgate, Kent.
Mediterranean	United Kingdom	The ship sank in the Bay of Luce. Her crew were rescued. She was on a voyage from Liverpool, Lancashire to Newcastle upon Tyne, Northumberland.

== 13 February ==
List of shipwrecks: 13 February 1836
Ship	State	Description
Toscan	Grand Duchy of Tuscany	The ship was wrecked on Île Sainte-Marguerite, Alpes-Maritimes, France. She was on a voyage from Livorno to Algiers, Algeria.

== 14 February ==
List of shipwrecks: 14 February 1836
Ship	State	Description
Black Diamond	United Kingdom	The ship was wrecked on the Kentish Knock. Her crew were rescued.
Damariscatti	United Kingdom	The ship capsized at South Shields, County Durham. She was righted the next day.
Jane and Ellen	United Kingdom	The ship was driven ashore at Maryport, Cumberland. She was refloated on 16 March.
John	United Kingdom	The smack ran aground and capsized at Berkeley Pill, Gloucestershire. Her crew were rescued.
Memoria	Sweden	The ship was driven ashore on Eierland, North Holland, Netherlands. Her crew were rescued. She was on a voyage from Nye Carleby to Marseille, Bouches-du-Rhône, France.
Mona	United Kingdom	The ship was driven ashore at Maryport. She was on a voyage from Kirkcudbright to Workington, Cumberland. Mona was refloated on 15 March.
Vine	United Kingdom	The ship struck the Newcombe Sand, in the North Sea off the coast of Norfolk and sank. Her crew were rescued.

== 15 February ==
List of shipwrecks: 15 February 1836
Ship	State	Description
Ann	United Kingdom	The schooner ran aground on the Burbo Bank, in Liverpool Bay.
Duos Journas	Portugal	The ship foundered off Madeira.
Emperor	United States	The ship was abandoned in the Atlantic Ocean. Her crew were rescued. She was on a voyage from Exuma to Baltimore, Maryland.
George Bentinck	United Kingdom	The ship sprang a leak and was beached at Hubberstone Pill, Pembrokeshire. She was on a voyage from Cardiff, Glamorgan to Limerick.
George Canning	United Kingdom	The ship ran aground on the Burbo Bank. She was on a voyage from Liverpool, Lancashire to New Orleans, Louisiana, United States.
James & Elizabeth	United Kingdom	The ship was holed by an anchor and sank in the River Tees.
Royal Victoria	United Kingdom	The steamship ran aground at Leith, Lothian. She was on a voyage from Leith to London. Royal Victoria was refloated on 16 February and resumed her voyage.
Traveller	United Kingdom	The ship was driven ashore and wrecked at Lowestoft, Suffolk with the loss of all but one of her crew.
Waringsford	United Kingdom	The brig ran aground on the Burbo Bank, in Liverpool Bay. She was on a voyage from Liverpool to Demerara. Waringsford was later refloated.

== 16 February ==
List of shipwrecks: 16 February 1836
Ship	State	Description
Alfred	United Kingdom	The brig was lost on the North Gar, in the North Sea off the mouth of the River Tees with the loss of all hands. She was on a voyage from Sunderland, County Durham to London.
Alfred	United Kingdom	The schooner departed from Seaham, County Durham for Wisbech, Cambridgeshire. Presumed subsequently foundered with the loss of all hands. One of her boats was found by the Dudgeon Lightship ( Trinity House).
Amity	United Kingdom	The ship was driven ashore 2 nautical miles (3.7 km) south of Bridlington, Yorkshire. Her crew were rescued.
Bee	United Kingdom	The sloop was driven ashore and wrecked at Sunderland. Her crew were rescued. She was on a voyage from Sunderland to Leith, Lothian.
Duchess of Gordon	United Kingdom	The smack was driven ashore at Findochty, Banffshire. Her crew were rescued.
Dutchman	United Kingdom	The ship was driven ashore and wrecked at Skipsea, Yorkshire. She was on a voyage from Yorkshire to London.
Edrachilles	United Kingdom	The ship was wrecked near Eyemouth, Berwickshire. Her crew were rescued.
Eleanor and Ann	United Kingdom	The sloop collided with a brig and foundered off the mouth of the Humber with the loss of two of her crew.
Emma	United Kingdom	The ship was driven ashore at the mouth of the River Tees. All on board were rescued. She was refloated on 21 March and taken in to Sunderland.
Félicite	France	The ship foundered in the North Sea off Egmond aan Zee, North Holland, Netherlands.
Hero	United Kingdom	The ship was driven ashore 2 nautical miles (3.7 km) south of Bridlington. Her crew were rescued. She was on a voyage from London to Sunderland. Hero was refloated on 9 March and taken in to Bridlington for repairs.
John Parker	United Kingdom	The ship was driven ashore and wrecked 2 nautical miles (3.7 km) south of Bridlington. Her crew were rescued by rocket apparatus. She was on a voyage from London to South Shields.
Marcella	United Kingdom	The schooner foundered off Stranraer, Wigtownshire. No crew were on board at the time. She was refloated on 5 March.
Margaret	United Kingdom	The ship was scuttled at Dunbar. Lothian.
Neptune	United Kingdom	The ship was driven ashore near Bridlington. Her crew were rescued. She was on a voyage from London to South Shields, County Durham. Neptune was refloated on 5 March and taken in to Bridlington.
Osprey	United Kingdom	The smack was driven ashore and wrecked at Thurso, Caithness. Her crew were rescued.
Trafalgar	United Kingdom	The ship capsized off Whitby, Yorkshire and was driven into port in that state. Her crew survived. She was on a voyage from Cork to Whitby.
William	United Kingdom	The brig was driven ashore at Point of Ayre, Isle of Man. Her six crew were rescued. She was on a voyage from Chepstow, Monmouthshire to the Clyde.
William Parker	United Kingdom	The ship was driven ashore near Bridlington. Her crew were rescued. She was on a voyage from London to Scarborough.

== 17 February ==
List of shipwrecks: 17 February 1836
Ship	State	Description
Abbey	United Kingdom	The schooner was driven ashore and wrecked at Port Stewart, Wigtownshire. Her crew were rescued. She was on a voyage from Limerick to Glasgow, Renfrewshire.
Active	United Kingdom	The ship was wrecked at Scarborough, Yorkshire.
Amicus	United Kingdom	The brig was driven ashore and wrecked at Blyth, Northumberland.
Ashburton	United Kingdom	The ship was driven ashore at Quillebeuf-sur-Seine, Eure, France.
Bee	United Kingdom	The ship was driven ashore and damaged near Grimsby, Lincolnshire. She was refloated on 5 March.
Bee	United Kingdom	The ship was driven ashore near Sunderland, County Durham. Her crew were rescued.
Blessing	United Kingdom	The ship was driven ashore at Blakeney, Norfolk. Her crew were rescued. She was on a voyage from London to Boston, Lincolnshire. Blessing was refloated in March and taken in to Cley-next-the-Sea, Norfolk.
Boulby	United Kingdom	The ship was driven ashore at Lingberry, Yorkshire. Her crew were rescued.
Carnatic	United Kingdom	The schooner was driven ashore and wrecked on Lindisfarne, Northumberland. Her crew were rescued. She was on a voyage from Stockton-on-Tees, County Durham to Cromarty.
Caroline	United Kingdom	The ship was driven ashore at Brancaster, Norfolk. She was refloated on 6 March and taken in to Wells-next-the-Sea, Norfolk.
Catharine	United Kingdom	The ship was driven ashore at Brancaster, Norfolk.
Ebenezer	United Kingdom	The ship was driven ashore and wrecked near Grimsby. Her crew were rescued.
Elizabeth and Ann	United Kingdom	The ship was driven ashore at Wisbech, Cambridgeshire. She was refloated on 18 March.
Emperor	United Kingdom	The ship was driven ashore and damaged near Grimsby. She was refloated on 7 March.
Enterprize	United Kingdom	The ship was driven ashore and wrecked near Seaton, County Durham. She was on a voyage from London to Stockton-on-Tees, County Durham.
Everton	United Kingdom	The ship was driven ashore near Liverpool, Lancashire. She was on a voyage from Saint John, New Brunswick, British North America to Liverpool.
Fanny	United Kingdom	The ship was driven ashore at Happisburgh, Norfolk. Her crew were rescued. She was on a voyage from London to Boston, Lincolnshire.
Free Briton	United Kingdom	The ship was driven ashore near Stockton-on-Tees, County Durham.
Governor Eustis	United States	The schooner was lost on Rainsford Island, in Boston Harbor. Crew saved.
Industry	United Kingdom	The ship was driven ashore and severely damaged near Grimsby.
Isabella	United Kingdom	The sloop was wrecked in the North Sea off the coast of Norfolk with the loss of all but one of her crew. The survivors was rescued by Toms (United Kingdom). Isabella was on a voyage from South Shields, County Durham to Lowestoft, Suffolk.
James and Elizabeth	United Kingdom	The ship struck an anchor and sank in the River Tyne. She was on a voyage from Great Yarmouth, Norfolk to Newcastle upon Tyne, Northumberland. She was refloated on 23 February and found to be severely damaged.
Janet and Agnes	United Kingdom	The sloop was driven ashore and wrecked 1 nautical mile (1.9 km) south of Scarborough, Yorkshire. Her crew were rescued, but eleven of the fifteen crew of the Scarborough Lifeboat were drowned when it capsized whilst going to her aid. Janet and Agnes was on a voyage from London to Alloa, Clackmannanshire.
Johns	United Kingdom	The ship was driven ashore in Ceylon Bay. She was refloated on 3 March and taken in to Scarborough.
Lady Abercromby	United Kingdom	The sloop was driven ashore Gourdon, Aberdeenshire. Her crew were rescued. She floated off and foundered 2 nautical miles (3.7 km) off Gourdon.
Liberty	United Kingdom	The ship was driven ashore near Grimsby. She was refloated on 22 February and taken in to Grimsby.
Liverpool	United Kingdom	The brig was wrecked east of Portrush, County Antrim with the loss of all hands. She was on a voyage from Limerick to Glasgow.
Nancy	United Kingdom	The ship was driven ashore at Wells-next-the-Sea, Norfolk. Her crew were rescued. She was refloated on 6 March but was again driven ashore. Nancy was refloated again on 18 March and taken in to Blakeney, Norfolk.
Norfolk	United Kingdom	The whaler was driven ashore in the River Tweed.
Oak	United Kingdom	The brig was driven ashore and wrecked at Cromer, Norfolk. Her crew were rescued.
Portsoy	United Kingdom	The ship was wrecked in Gamrie Bay. Her crew were rescued.
Reform	United Kingdom	The ship was driven ashore near Grimsby.
Sincerity	United Kingdom	The schooner was wrecked on the Herd Sand, in the North Sea off the coast of County Durham, with the loss of all hands.
Solide	Hamburg	The ship was driven ashore and wrecked on the Gelb Sand, in the North Sea off Cuxhaven. All but four of those on board were rescued, the remainder reached Neuwerk. She was on a voyage from Rio de Janeiro, Brazil to Hamburg.
Stockton	United Kingdom	The ship was wrecked at Scarborough.
Thorney Close	United Kingdom	The ship was driven ashore near Stockton-on-Tees.
Traveller	United Kingdom	The ship was run down in the North Sea off Mundesley, Norfolk with the loss of all but one of her crew. She subsequently came ashore at Mundesley.
Trent	United Kingdom	The ship was driven ashore at Cromer with the loss of five of her crew. She was on a voyage from Newcastle upon Tyne to London.
Trevor	United Kingdom	The ship sank off Fishguard, Pembrokeshire. Her crew were rescued by the Fishguard Lifeboat. She was on a voyage from Newport, Monmouthshire to Runcorn, Cheshire.
Unity	United Kingdom	The ship was wrecked at Scarborough.
William	United Kingdom	The ship was driven ashore and damaged near Grimsby. Her crew were rescued. She was refloated on 5 March.
Young Susan	United Kingdom	The ship was driven ashore near Grimsby. Her crew were rescued.

== 18 February ==
List of shipwrecks: 18 February 1836
Ship	State	Description
Active	United Kingdom	The ship was driven ashore at Lowestoft, Suffolk. She was refloated on 22 February and taken in to Lowestoft.
Agenoria	France	The sloop foundered off Fécamp, Seine-Inférieure.
Aguilon	France	The ship was driven ashore at Marshchapel, Lincolnshire, United Kingdom. She was on a voyage from Dunkirk, Nord to Sunderland, County Durham, United Kingdom.
Barbara	United Kingdom	The ship was driven ashore at Lowestoft. She was on a voyage from London to Goole, Yorkshire. Barbara had been refloated by 24 February.
Benjamin	United Kingdom	The ship was driven ashore and wrecked at Wrangle, Lincolnshire.
Betsey	United Kingdom	The ship was driven ashore at Lowestoft.
Biddick	United Kingdom	The ship was driven ashore at Lowestoft. She was consequently condemned.
Brunswick	United Kingdom	The ship was driven ashore at Lowestoft. She was refloated on 22 February and taken in to Lowestoft.
Charles and Elizabeth	United Kingdom	The ship was wrecked on the Long Sand, in the North Sea off the coast of Kent. Her crew survived. She was on a voyage from London to South Shields, County Durham.
Diligent	United Kingdom	The ship struck the quayside at Havre de Grâce, Seine-Inférieure, France and sank. Her crew were rescued. She was on a voyage from Newcastle upon Tyne, Northumberland to Have de Grâce.
Dove	United Kingdom	The ship was driven ashore at Pakefield, Suffolk. She was refloated on 21 March and taken in to Lowestoft.
Eagle	United Kingdom	The smack was driven ashore and wrecked at Lofthouse, Yorkshire. Her crew were rescued.
Eclipse	United Kingdom	The ship was driven ashore near Whitstable, Kent.
Eliza	United Kingdom	The ship was driven ashore at Bridlington, Yorkshire. Her crew were rescued. She was refloated on 5 March and taken in to Bridlington.
Etherly	United Kingdom	The ship was abandoned in the North Sea off the coast of Essex. She was subsequently taken in to Harwich.
George	United Kingdom	The ship was driven ashore at Kessingland, Suffolk. She was refloated on 10 March and taken in to Lowestoft.
Gleaner	United Kingdom	The ship foundered in the North Sea off Whitstable.
Gateshead	United Kingdom	The ship was driven ashore near Huttoft, Lincolnshire. She was later refloated and taken in to Hull, Yorkshire, where she arrived in late March.
Hannah	United Kingdom	The ship was driven ashore at Pakefield.
Hannah's Success	United Kingdom	The ship was driven ashore at Pakefield.
Henry and William	United Kingdom	The ship was driven ashore at King's Lynn, Norfolk. She was refloated on 19 November.
Herald	United Kingdom	The ship was wrecked on the Goodwin Sands, Kent. Her crew were rescued. She was on a voyage from Seaham to Portsmouth, Hampshire.
Hull Packet	United Kingdom	The ship was driven ashore at Wicklow.
James and Agnes	United Kingdom	The ship was driven ashore near Scarborough. Her crew were rescued. She was on a voyage from London to Alloa, Clackmannanshire.
James and Elizabeth	United Kingdom	The ship was driven ashore near South Shields.
Janet	United Kingdom	The ship was driven ashore at Kessingland. She was consequently condemned.
Jessie	United Kingdom	The ship was driven ashore at Pakefield. She was refloated on 22 February and taken in to Lowestoft, where she was repaired.
John	United Kingdom	The ship was driven ashore at Lowestoft.
John	United Kingdom	The ship was driven ashore and wrecked at Cayton, Yorkshire with the loss of all hands.
Leda	United Kingdom	The ship was driven ashore at Lowestoft. She had been refloated by 24 February.
Lydia	United Kingdom	The ship was driven ashore at Kessingland.
Margaret	United States	The brig was lost at Port Dauphiné, Madagascar. Her crew survived. She was on a voyage from Canton, China to an American port.
Mars	United Kingdom	The brig foundered in the North Sea off Wells-next-the-Sea, Norfolk with the loss of all hands.
Martha	United Kingdom	The ship was driven ashore between "Clea Ness" and "Hallinborough". She was refloated on 20 February and taken in to Hull, Yorkshire.
Mary	United Kingdom	The South Shields-registered ship was driven ashore at Lowestoft.
Mary	United Kingdom	The North Shields-registered ship was driven ashore at Lowestoft.
Mary	United Kingdom	The ship was wrecked at Kinsale, County Cork. Her crew were rescued.
May	United Kingdom	The ship was driven ashore near Lowestoft.
Meanwell	United Kingdom	The ship was driven ashore at Pakefield. She was consequently condemned.
Nancy	United Kingdom	The ship struck the Kentish Knock, in the North Sea off the coast of Kent and was abandoned. Her crew were rescued by Arrow (United Kingdom). Nancy was on a voyage from London to South Shields. She subsequently came ashore at Kingsgate, Kent and was wrecked.
Nancy	United Kingdom	The ship was wrecked on the Pye Sand, in the North Sea off the coast of Essex. Her crew survived. She was on a voyage from London to Sunderland.
Nancy	United Kingdom	The ship was driven ashore between "Clea Ness" and "Hallinborough". She was on a voyage from Wells-next-the-Sea, Norfolk to Wisbech, Cambridgeshire. Nancy was refloated on 20 February and taken in to Hull.
Nelson	United Kingdom	The ship was driven ashore at Southwold, Suffolk. Her crew were rescued.
Oak	United Kingdom	The ship struck Felton's Rock and foundered. Her crew were rescued.
Priscilla	United Kingdom	The brigantine was driven ashore and wrecked at Sea Palling, Norfolk with the loss of all hands.
Red Rover	United Kingdom	The ship was driven ashore at Kessingland. She was refloated on 7 March and taken in to Great Yarmouth.
Roscoe Castle	United Kingdom	The ship was driven ashore near Dover, Kent. She was on a voyage from London to Constantinople, Ottoman Empire. Roscoe Castle was refloated on 18 February and taken in to Dover.
Seder	United Kingdom	The ship was driven ashore at Lowestoft.
Spring	United Kingdom	The ship was driven ashore at Pakefield. She was refloated on 16 March and taken in to Lowestoft.
Thetis	United Kingdom	The ship was driven ashore at Great Yarmouth. She was refloated on 19 February and taken in to Great Yarmouth.
Thomas and Ann	United Kingdom	The ship was driven ashore at Lowestoft. She had been refloated by 24 February.
Thomas and Mary	United Kingdom	The ship was driven ashore between "Clea Ness" and "Hallinborough".
Trent	United Kingdom	The ship was driven ashore at Cromer, Norfolk with the loss of all hands. She was refloated in March and taken in to Cley-next-the-Sea.
Udney	United Kingdom	The ship was driven ashore at Pakefield.
Union	United Kingdom	The ship was driven ashore at Lowestoft. She was refloated on 20 February.
Venus	United Kingdom	The ship was driven ashore near Lowestoft. She had been refloated by 24 February.
Vittoria	United Kingdom	The ship was driven ashore at Sheringham, Norfolk. Her crew were rescued.
Vrow Meta	Flag unknown	The ship ran aground on the Noordland Bank, in the North Sea. She was on a voyage from Antwerp, Belgium to Cuxhaven.
William	United Kingdom	The ship was driven ashore at Corton. She was refloated on 18 March and taken in to Great Yarmaouth.
Yare	United Kingdom	The ship was driven ashore at Wells-next-the-Sea, Norfolk. Her crew were rescued.

== 19 February ==
List of shipwrecks: 19 February 1836
Ship	State	Description
Buddich	United Kingdom	The ship was driven ashore at Kessingland, Suffolk.
Diamond	(United Kingdom of Great Britain and Ireland) Saint Vincent	The ship was driven ashore in the Delaware River. She was on a voyage from Wilmington, Delaware, United States to Saint Vincent.
Eleanor	United Kingdom	The ship ran aground on the Shipwash Sand in the North Sea off the coast of Essex. She was on a voyage from Burntisland, Fife to London. Eleanor was refloated the next day and taken in to Harwich, Essex.
George	United Kingdom	The ship was driven ashore at Kessingland.
Hope (two ships of this name)	United Kingdom	The South Shields-registered ship Hope collided with the Wisbech-registered ship Hope in the North Sea off Lowestoft, Suffolk. Both vessels foundered. Their crews were rescued.
John and Mary	United Kingdom	The ship was driven ashore and severely damaged at Holbeach Marsh, Lincolnshire.
Newcastle	United Kingdom	The ship was driven ashore at Pakefield, Suffolk.
Peace	United Kingdom	The ship was driven ashore at Kessingland. Her crew were rescued. She was refloated on 28 February and taken in to Lowestoft.
Reformation	United Kingdom	The ship was driven ashore and severely damaged at Cleethorpes, Lincolnshire. She was on a voyage from Wisbech, Cambridgeshire to Stockwith, on the River Trent. Reformation was refloated on 22 February and taken in to Grimsby.
Wilkian	United Kingdom	The ship was driven ashore on the Isle of Man. she was on a voyage from Chepstow, Monmouthshire to Glasgow, Renfrewshire.

== 20 February ==
List of shipwrecks: 20 February 1836
Ship	State	Description
Cherub	United States	The ship was driven ashore and damaged at Charleston, South Carolina. She was refloated on 2 March.
Ellen	United Kingdom	The sloop was driven ashore and wrecked near Sandown, Kent. She was on a voyage from London to Plymouth, Devon.
Elizabeth	United Kingdom	The ship was driven ashore at Grimsby, Lincolnshire.
Fortitude	United Kingdom	The brig was driven ashore and wrecked at Mablethorpe, Lincolnshire with the loss of all hands. She was on a voyage from Newcastle upon Tyne, Northumberland to London.
Gazelle	United Kingdom	The ship was wrecked on the Paardenmarkt, in the North Sea off the coast of West Flanders, Belgium.
Hawk Packet	United Kingdom	The ship foundered in the North Sea off the coast of Lincolnshire. Her crew were rescued by Friends (United Kingdom). Hawk Packet was on a voyage from Seaham, County Durham to London.
Hope	United Kingdom	The ship was driven ashore at Great Orme Head, Caernarfonshire.
Iris	United Kingdom	The sloop sank at Saint Vincent.
Luzia	Portugal	The ship was driven ashore and capsized at Boavista, Brazil.
Nimble	United Kingdom	The ship was driven ashore at Great Orme Head.
Rockcliff	United Kingdom	The sloop was wrecked on the Crimson Rock, in the North Sea. Her four crew were rescued by Mermaid (United Kingdom).
Tellacre	United Kingdom	The ship was driven ashore at Great Orme Head.
Tower	United Kingdom	The ship was driven ashore at Great Orme Head.
Vesta	United Kingdom	The ship ran aground and capsized at Swinefleet, Yorkshire. Her crew were rescued. She was on a voyage from King's Lynn, Norfolk to Goole, Yorkshire.

== 21 February ==
List of shipwrecks: 21 February 1836
Ship	State	Description
Constant Trader	United Kingdom	The ship was driven ashore at Walton, Suffolk.

== 22 February ==
List of shipwrecks: 22 February 1836
Ship	State	Description
Pyrrha	United Kingdom	The ship capsized in the North Sea of the north Norfolk coast.

== 23 February ==
List of shipwrecks: 23 February 1836
Ship	State	Description
New Frederick	United Kingdom	The brig collided with another vessel off the Isle of Wight and was severely damaged. She was blown towards the French coast where her crew were taken off by some French fishing boats.

== 24 February ==
List of shipwrecks: 24 February 1836
Ship	State	Description
Emerald Isle	United Kingdom	The schooner was driven ashore and wrecked near Wick, Caithness with the loss of a crew member. She was on a voyage from Wick to Newry, County Antrim.

== 25 February ==
List of shipwrecks: 25 February 1836
Ship	State	Description
Duke of Wellington	United Kingdom	The ship was driven ashore and wrecked at Plat Saline, Alderney, Channel Islands. Her crew were rescued. She was on a voyage from Looe, Cornwall to London.
Hollander	Netherlands	The ship was abandoned off the coast of Massachusetts, United States. Her crew were rescued. She was on a voyage from Rotterdam, South Holland to Lisbon, Portugal and Boston, Massachusetts.

== 26 February ==
List of shipwrecks: 26 February 1836
Ship	State	Description
Hannah	United Kingdom	The ship was wrecked on the Long Sand, in the North Sea. Her crew were rescued. She was on a voyage from South Shields, County Durham to Lisbon, Portugal.
Thetis	United Kingdom	The ship was driven ashore near Philadelphia, Pennsylvania. She was on a voyage from Stockholm, Sweden to Gibraltar and Philadelphia.
Vittoria	Brazil	The ship sprang a leak and was beached at Dénia, Spain. She was on a voyage from Maranhão to Trieste.
Yeoman's Glory	United Kingdom	The ship was driven ashore near Padstow, Cornwall.

== 27 February ==
List of shipwrecks: 27 February 1836
Ship	State	Description
Barbara	United Kingdom	The ship was driven ashore at Drogheda, County Louth. She was on a voyage from Preston, Lancashire to Drogheda.
Richmond	United Kingdom	The ship was driven ashore and sank at Drogheda. She was on a voyage from Irvine, Ayrshire to Drogheda.
Talacre	United Kingdom	The ship was driven ashore and damaged at Bangor, Caernarfonshire.

== 28 February ==
List of shipwrecks: 28 February 1836
Ship	State	Description
Lord Gambier	United Kingdom	The ship departed from Swansea, Glamorgan for Jersey, Channel Islands. No further trace, presumed foundered with the loss of all hands.

== 29 February ==
List of shipwrecks: 29 February 1836
Ship	State	Description
Albion	(United Kingdom of Great Britain and Ireland) British North America	The ship was lost off the Turks Islands. Her crew were rescued. She was on a voyage from Liverpool, Nova Scotia to Barbados.
Phyrra	United Kingdom	The ship foundered in the North Sea 12 nautical miles (22 km) off Wells-next-the-Sea, Norfolk.

== Unknown date ==
List of shipwrecks: Unknown date in February 1836
Ship	State	Description
Ann	(United Kingdom of Great Britain and Ireland) British North America	The ship was lost near Boston, Massachusetts, United States before 5 February. She was on a voyage from Saint John, New Brunswick to Ireland.
Ann	United Kingdom	The ship foundered with the loss of all hands. She was on a voyage from Scotland to Cley-next-the-Sea, Norfolk.
Astrea	Denmark	The brig was abandoned in the North Sea. Her crew survived. She was on a voyage from Bergen to Genoa, Kingdom of Sardinia. Astrea was subsequently taken in to Thurso, Caithness, United Kingdom.
Atalanta	United States	The schooner was lost at "Tuspan".
Baslado	France	The ship was driven ashore and wrecked at Gibraltar. She was on a voyage from Marseille, Bouches-du-Rhône to Glasgow, Renfrewshire, United Kingdom.
Burlington	United Kingdom	The ship foundered in the North Sea after 15 February.
Constantia	Belgium	The ship was driven ashore at Holyhead, Anglesey, United Kingdom. She was on a voyage from Liverpool, Lancashire, United Kingdom to Antwerp. Constantia was refloated on 5 February and taken in to Holyhead.
Countess of Cassilis	United Kingdom	The ship was driven ashore in Troon Bay. She was on a voyage from Belfast, County Antrim to Workington, Cumberland. Countess of Cassilis was later refloated.
Cupid	United Kingdom	The ship was driven ashore and wrecked on Long Island, New York. All on board were rescued. She was on a voyage from Newry, County Antrim to New York City.
Darlington	United Kingdom	The ship was driven ashore nearBrancaster, Norfolk. She was refloated on 18 March and taken in to Brancaster.
Diligent	United Kingdom	The ship foundered near Havre de Grâce, Seine-Inférieure, France. Her crew were rescued.
Eagle	United Kingdom	The sloop was driven ashore and wrecked at Hummersty, Yorkshire. Her crew were rescued.
Edmond	United Kingdom	The ship was lost at Porto, Portugal before 20 February. She was on a voyage from Liverpool to Porto.
Eliza and Nancy	United Kingdom	The ship was abandoned off Ouessant, Finistère, France, on or before 7 February. Two crew were rescued by John and Edward (United Kingdom).
Elizabeth	United Kingdom	The ship was driven ashore near Ugento, Grand Duchy of Tuscany before 25 February. She was on a voyage from Naples, Kingdom of the Two Sicilies to Gallipoli, Ottoman Empire.
Ellen and Ann	United Kingdom	The ship collided with Felicity (United Kingdom) in the North Sea off Flamborough Head, Yorkshire and foundered. Two of her crew were presumed lost.
Experiment	(United Kingdom of Great Britain and Ireland) New South Wales	The schooner was wrecked at Port Macquarie with the loss of one life.
Fanny	United Kingdom	The ship foundered off Padstow, Cornwall on or before 4 February.
Favourite	United Kingdom	The ship foundered in the North Sea off the coast of Yorkshire. At least three of her crew survived. She was on a voyage from Newcastle upon Tyne, Northumberland to Honfleur, Calvados, France.
Friendship	United Kingdom	The ship struck the Nathaniel Knowl, in the North Sea and was damaged. She was consequently beached at Harwich, Essex. Friendship was on a voyage from Blyth, Northumberland to London.
George and Elizabeth	United Kingdom	The ship ran aground on the Long Sand, in the North Sea. She was on a voyage from London to South Shields, County Durham.
Gondolier	United Kingdom	The ship was driven ashore and wrecked on Robin Island, Africa before 8 February. She was on a voyage from Liverpool, Lancashire to Madras and Bengal, India.
Holderness	United Kingdom	The ship was wrecked at Dimlington, Yorkshire. She was on a voyage from London to South Shields.
Howard	United Kingdom	The ship was driven ashore and damaged near Liverpool before 16 February. She was on a voyage from New Orleans, Louisiana, United States to Liverpool. Howard was later refloated and taken in to Liverpool for repairs.
John	United Kingdom	The ship was wrecked near Scarborough, Yorkshire with the loss of all hands.
John and Amelia	United Kingdom	The ship was driven ashore and damaged at Pakefield, Suffolk. She was refloated on 6 February and taken in to Lowestoft, Suffolk.
Jones	United Kingdom	The sloop foundered in the North Sea off Scarborough with the loss of all hands.
Juno	United Kingdom	The ship was wrecked off Cape Spartivento, Sardinia before 19 February with the loss of all but three of her crew.
Limerick	United Kingdom	The ship was driven ashore and wrecked near South Shields, County Durham.
Linnet	United Kingdom	The ship was driven ashore at Macduff, Aberdeenshire.
Majestic	United Kingdom	The ship was abandoned in the Atlantic Ocean (43°20′N 28°00′W) before 6 February. She was towed in to Madeira on 15 June in a wrecked condition.
Nautilus	United Kingdom	The ship was wrecked near Liverpool. She was on a voyage from Liverpool to Nova Scotia, British North America.
P. J. Nevins	United States	The ship was driven ashore and severely damaged at Saint John, New Brunswick, British North America. Her crew were rescued.
Norman	(United Kingdom of Great Britain and Ireland) British North America	The ship was wrecked in Placentia Bay. Her crew were rescued. She was on a voyage from Digby, Nova Scotia to Saint John, New Brunswick.
Royal Oak	United Kingdom	The ship sank at Liverpool.
San Andrea	Spain	The ship ran aground on the Cat Head Keys. She was on a voyage from Havana, Cuba to Santander. San Andrea was later refloated and taken in to Nassau, Bahamas.
Sir Joseph Banks	United Kingdomô	The ship sprang a leak and was abandoned in the Atlantic Ocean. Her crew were rescued by Louisa (United Kingdom). She was on a voyage from Saint John, New Brunswick, British North America to Lancaster, Lancashire.
Superior	(United Kingdom of Great Britain and Ireland) British North America	The ship was abandoned in the Atlantic Ocean. Her crew were rescued.
Susannah	United Kingdom	The ship foundered in the North Sea off Wainfleet, Lincolnshire. Her crew were rescued.
Theodore	United Kingdom	The ship was driven ashore whilst on a voyage from Antwerp to Ostend, West Flanders, Belgium.
Thetis	United States	The ship was wrecked on "Seaming Beach" with the loss of five of her crew. She was on a voyage from Gibraltar to Philadelphia, Pennsylvania.
Trafalgar	United Kingdom	The ship was wrecked near Cambrose, Cornwall.
Violet	United Kingdom	The ship was driven ashore at Hummersty. Her crew were rescued.
