= Holbeach St Marks =

Village in Lincolnshire, England

Coordinates: 52.861254°N 0.044592°E

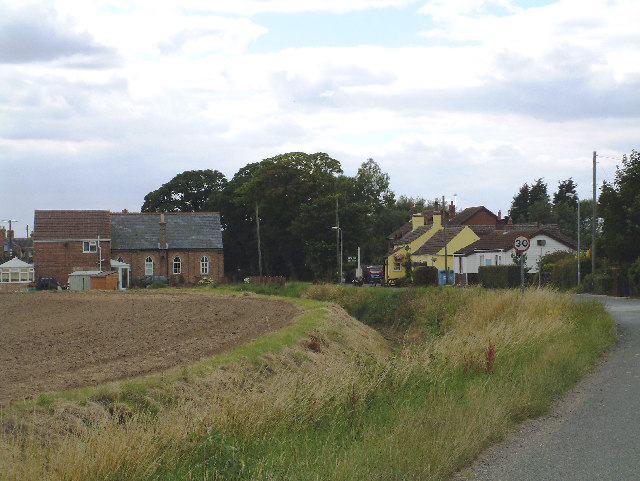
- Holbeach St Marks

- Location within Lincolnshire
- OS grid reference: TF377312
  - London: 95 mi (153 km) S
- District: South Holland
- Shire county: Lincolnshire
- Region: East Midlands
- Country: England
- Sovereign state: United Kingdom
- Post town: Spalding
- Postcode district: PE12
- Police: Lincolnshire
- Fire: Lincolnshire
- Ambulance: East Midlands
- UK Parliament: South Holland and The Deepings

Holbeach St Marks is a fenland village in the South Holland district of southern Lincolnshire, England. It is 5 miles (8 km) north from Holbeach, 3 miles (5 km) from The Wash, and at the centre of Holbeach Marsh.

The village church is dedicated to St Mark, and was built to the designs of Ewan Christian in 1868–69. In 1964 Pevsner mentioned that it was almost a copy of Christian's Christ Church church at Gedney Dawsmere 4 miles to the east. It is constructed of red brick with stone bands, a brick-faced interior, lancet windows, and a combined nave and apse. The slate roof holds a bellcote.

T. H. White was once a resident at the village's New Inn public house.

The village school is the Holbeach St Mark's Church of England Primary School for mixed gender 4 to 11 year olds, providing for pupils in the village and surrounding area.

Holbeach St Marks was home to the Tinsley Food plant, a major county employer supplying Safeway and Marks and Spencer. In 2001 it closed its factory with the loss of 850 jobs. The site was acquired by food manufacturing company Bakkavör until its almost complete closure in 2019, with only its pizza making facility in operation.
