= Holbeach Fen =

Coordinates: 52.771564°N 0.017843°E

- Location within Lincolnshire
- OS grid reference: TF362212
  - London: 90 mi (140 km) S
- District: South Holland
- Shire county: Lincolnshire
- Region: East Midlands
- Country: England
- Sovereign state: United Kingdom
- Post town: Spalding
- Postcode district: PE12
- Police: Lincolnshire
- Fire: Lincolnshire
- Ambulance: East Midlands
- UK Parliament: South Holland and The Deepings

Holbeach Fen is a fenland settlement and area in the South Holland district of southern Lincolnshire, England. It is 3 miles (5 km) south from Holbeach and 3 miles north-west from Sutton St James.

In 1885 Kelly’s noted that Holbeach Fen had become an ecclesiastical parish in 1867, had an area of 6,190 acres (25.1 km^{2}) and an 1881 population of 872.

St John’s chapel of ease was erected in 1840 by Robert Eliot of Fleet on land donated by the Duke of Somerset KG, and by subscription, particularly from Bishop Kaye of Lincoln. Brick built in Early English style it was described by Pevsner in 1964 as consisting of a nave, short chancel, lancet windows, bellcote and shallow porch.
