= Fleet Hargate =

Village in Lincolnshire, England

Coordinates: 52.804059°N 0.06918°E

- Location within Lincolnshire
- Population: 838 (2007)
- OS grid reference: TF3925
  - London: 90 mi (140 km) S
- Civil parish: Fleet
- District: South Holland
- Shire county: Lincolnshire
- Region: East Midlands
- Country: England
- Sovereign state: United Kingdom
- Post town: SPALDING
- Postcode district: PE12
- Dialling code: 01406
- Police: Lincolnshire
- Fire: Lincolnshire
- Ambulance: East Midlands
- UK Parliament: South Holland and the Deepings

Fleet Hargate is a village in the South Holland district of Lincolnshire, England. It is situated 2 miles (3.2 km) east from Holbeach, and just south from the A17 road. It falls within the wider civil parish of Fleet, which stretches from Gedney to Holbeach with a total estimated population in 2011 of 2,136.

== Community ==
The village of Fleet Hargate has been designated a conservation area by South Holland District Council, one of 13 within the district.

Village amenities are a public house – the Rose and Crown, a caravan park, a day nursery, and a farm shop that includes a garden centre and tea room.

== History ==
The village now sits just south of the A17, although previously the main road ran through the village. The Old Main Road as it is now named was part of the Boston to Lynn road, managed in part by the original Holbeach Turnpike trust.

The now closed Fleet railway station, formerly of the Midland and Great Northern Joint Railway, is on Eastgate. It was served by the Fleet Light Railway, a potato railway built around 1910 to connect the Worth family farms to the mainline railway.

The Bull, originally a pub and lodging house is (@2017) being turned into a private dwelling.

A Terrier of Fleet Lincolnshire is a 1920 publication based on the 11th-century manuscript Fleet Terrier – a 'terrier' is a legal document detailing land, similar to a Glebe terrier.

== Alternate Spellings ==
Fleet Hard Gate
