= Gedney Dyke =

Village in Lincolnshire, England

Coordinates: 52.8130°N 0.0924074°E

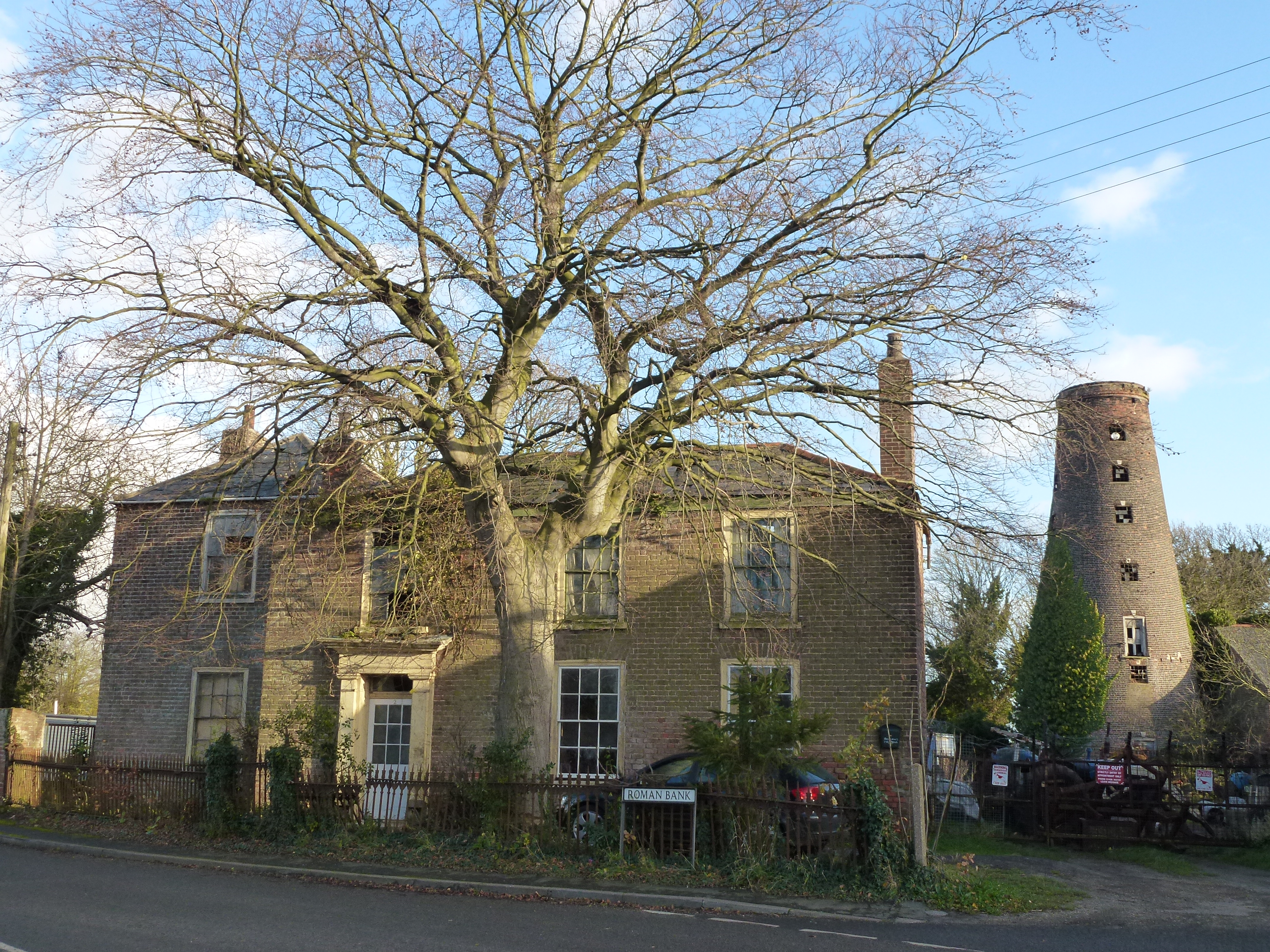
- House and mill tower in Gedney Dyke

- Location within Lincolnshire
- OS grid reference: TF411259
  - London: 90 mi (140 km) S
- District: South Holland
- Shire county: Lincolnshire
- Region: East Midlands
- Country: England
- Sovereign state: United Kingdom
- Post town: SPALDING
- Postcode district: PE12
- Dialling code: 01406
- Police: Lincolnshire
- Fire: Lincolnshire
- Ambulance: East Midlands
- UK Parliament: South Holland and The Deepings

Gedney Dyke is a village in the civil parish of Gedney and the South Holland district of Lincolnshire, England. It is 40 miles (64 km) south-east from the city and county town of Lincoln, and 13 miles (20 km) from both Boston at the north-west and King's Lynn at the south-east.

Gedney Dyke is 1 mile (1.6 km) north from the parish village of Gedney, and 4 miles (6 km) from the south-west shore of The Wash estuary. The village is centred where Roman Bank road runs into Main Street at the junction with Engine Dyke road. Roman Bank and Engine Dyke are part of the B1359 road which runs from Gedney Drove End, at the north-east, to Long Sutton to the southeast. Within the village are detached and semi detached houses, bungalows, a village farm, and a village hall. At the junction of Roman Bank and Engine Dyke are the remains of a tower mill, and at the junction of Memorial Lane with Main Street is a war memorial. South-west of the village, near the junction of Main Street and Lowgate, is The Chequers public house and restaurant. Bus services connect the village with Holbeach and Long Sutton.

Within Gedney Dyke are four Grade II listed structures. Seadyke Mill is a 68 feet (20 m) high red brick seven-storey tower mill for cereals dating to 1836. The mill, which was part of a village farm complex, was working until 1842. Its four sails were removed in 1947. Next to the mill is a c.1820 red brick, hipped roof, two-storey house on Mill Bank. Peregrine's Rest at the south of the village is a red brick house dating to 1767. Gedney Dyke war memorial for those who died in the First and Second World Wars, a 9 feet (3 m) obelisk in Aberdeen granite designed by the local mason Charles Warrick, was "unveiled on 4 April 1920". In a field at the northwest of Main Street was found mounds of a previous medieval saltern, evidenced by "burnt earth, slag [and] shells". A former post office with general store (built 1903) at the corner of Main Street and Engine Dyke was converted to a residential property in 2018.

In 1872 White's Directory of Lincolnshire recorded a Free Methodist chapel at Gedney Dyke. Occupations and trades at the time included six farmers, one of whom was also a grazier, another a corn merchant, and another a grocer & draper. There were two beerhouse proprietors, one of whom was also a blacksmith, a shopkeeper, two shoemakers, a tailor, a butcher, a wheelwright, and the licensed victuallers of 'The Chequers' and the 'Crown & Woolpack' public houses. A business called Savage Brothers were grocers, bakers, offal dealers, coal merchants, and agents for guano and artificial manures. Earlier, in 1856, White's had recorded both a Wesleyan and a Free Methodist chapel, and occupations including a baker, a drillman, a blacksmith, a wheelwright, three boot & shoe makers, two butchers, four shopkeepers, two tailors, a corn miller at 'Cross Mill' who was also a merchant, and eight farmers & graziers in five families. Also listed were the occupants of the 'Chequers', the 'Crown & Woolpack', and a beerhouse. The Methodist chapel, which had been built in 1866, "adjacent to the burial ground", closed in 1967.
