= Holbeach Hurn =

Village in Lincolnshire, England

Coordinates: 52.822994°N 0.068473°E

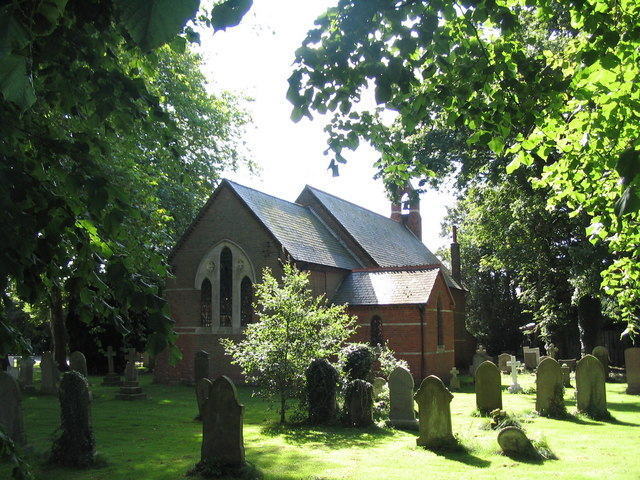
- St Luke's Church, Holbeach Hurn

- Location within Lincolnshire
- OS grid reference: TF394270
  - London: 95 mi (153 km) S
- District: South Holland
- Shire county: Lincolnshire
- Region: East Midlands
- Country: England
- Sovereign state: United Kingdom
- Post town: Spalding
- Postcode district: PE12
- Police: Lincolnshire
- Fire: Lincolnshire
- Ambulance: East Midlands
- UK Parliament: South Holland and The Deepings

Holbeach Hurn is a small fenland village in the civil parish of Holbeach in the South Holland district of southern Lincolnshire, England. It is 2.5 miles (4.0 km) north-east from Holbeach and 1 mile (1.6 km) north from the A17, and lies at the south-east of Holbeach Marsh.

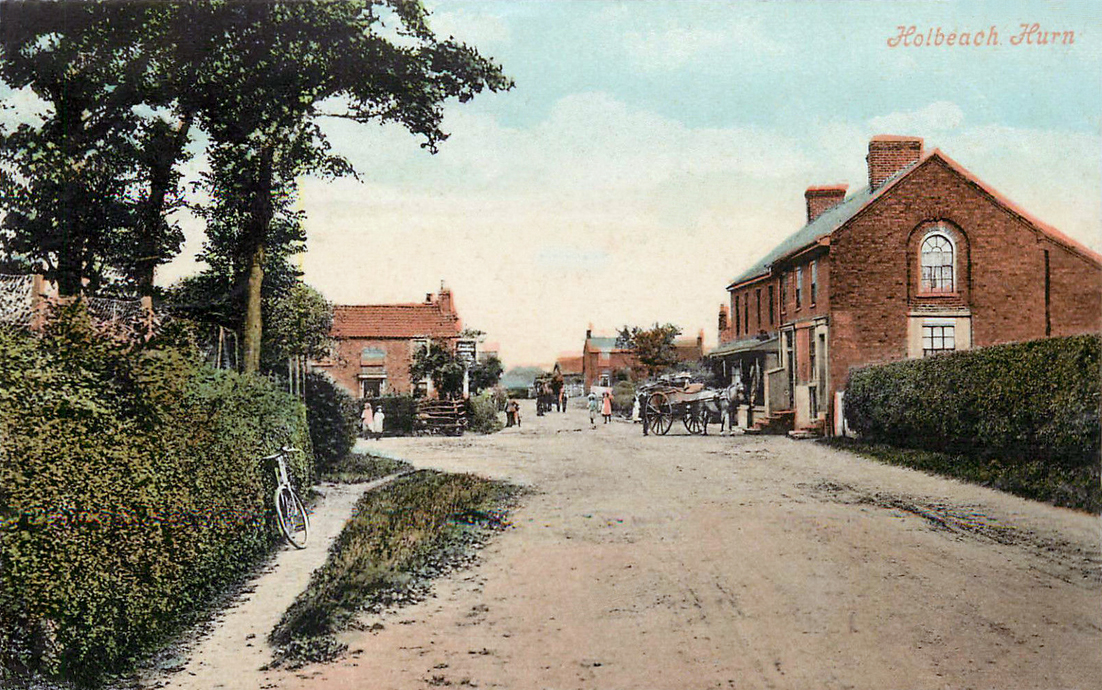
Holbeach Hurn before 1916

Holbeach Hurn appears as the one word 'Holbechehern' in a legal record of 1433. In 1885 Kelly’s noted the village as an ecclesiastical parish formed from that of Holbeach in 1870, and the presence of both a Wesleyan and Primitive Methodist chapel. Its area was 3,250 acres (13.2 km^{2}) with an 1881 population of 526.

The village church, dedicated to St Luke, was built between 1869 and 1871. It is constructed of red brick in Early English style and consists of chancel, nave and south porch, and an alabaster reredos with evangelistic symbols. In 1964 Pevsner reported a bellcote and lancet windows, and within the church a large early 19th-century painting of the Adoration of the Shepherds, "no doubt the altarpiece of an important church".
