= Holbeach Bank =

Village in Lincolnshire, England

Coordinates: 52.8269°N 0.01093°E

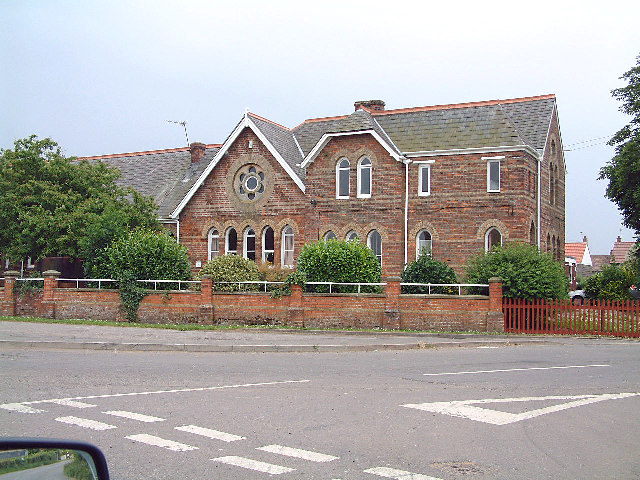
- The 1877 Holbeach Bank Board School

- Location within Lincolnshire
- OS grid reference: TF355273
  - London: 90 mi (140 km) S
- Civil parish: Holbeach
- District: South Holland
- Shire county: Lincolnshire
- Region: East Midlands
- Country: England
- Sovereign state: United Kingdom
- Post town: SPALDING
- Postcode district: PE12
- Dialling code: 01406
- Police: Lincolnshire
- Fire: Lincolnshire
- Ambulance: East Midlands
- UK Parliament: South Holland and The Deepings

Holbeach Bank is a fenland village in the South Holland district of Lincolnshire, England. It is just under 2 miles (3 km) north from the market town of Holbeach, and 1 mile (2 km) to the east of the A17 road. The village is almost conjoined at the west to the village of Holbeach Clough. Holbeach Bank is part of the Holbeach civil parish and is at the south-east edge of Holbeach Marsh.

== History ==
In 1835 the Primitive Methodists of Holbeach Bank decided to build a chapel, as an alternative to occupying another vacated chapel. A foundation stone for a new chapel was laid, with 90 members of the congregation each laying a brick on which they placed money; more than £7 was raised, with more than £50 promised to the trustees. PastScape records a Primitive Methodist chapel as being built in 1833. The building, gabled and of three bays, was demolished in 1999, and lay at the junction of Roman Bank and Star Lane.

A board school was built in 1877 with places for 180 children, of whom 130 attended on average. This previous village school is described by Nikolaus Pevsner as "surprisingly large... [with] polychromatic brickwork and an array of lancets." He believes the architect might have been Joseph Sawyer who had built other board schools in the area.

Occupations listed in 1855 included a shopkeeper, cattle dealer, two farmers and a butcher, and in 1872 a bricklayer, a farmer, a beer house proprietor and two saddlers. The farmer and the beer retailer remained in 1885. By 1933 those listed included a farmer, a smallholder, a shopkeeper, a carpenter, two builders, and a beer retailer.

In 1936 a scheme was drawn up by the Boston and District Electricity Supply Co. and presented to the Rural District Council, proposing a supply of electricity to Holbeach Bank

== Amenities ==
The new village primary school is Holbeach Bank Academy (formerly Holbeach Bank Board School), on Roman Bank. The village football team plays in the Peterborough and District Football League.

== Landmarks ==
- Victorian windmill on Washway Road
- The UK's smallest Pillbox on Penny-Bridge Road
