= Holbeach Clough =

Fenland village in the South Holland district of Lincolnshire, England

Coordinates: 52.8244°N 0.01258°W

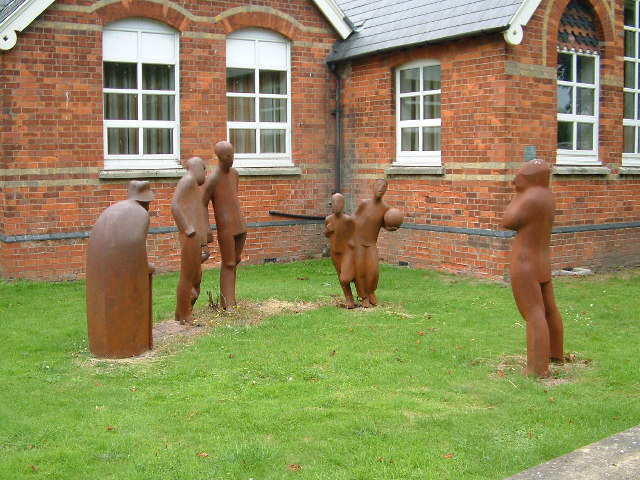
- Sculptures at Saracens Head Village Hall

- Location within Lincolnshire
- OS grid reference: TF340270
  - London: 90 mi (140 km) S
- Civil parish: Holbeach
- District: South Holland
- Shire county: Lincolnshire
- Region: East Midlands
- Country: England
- Sovereign state: United Kingdom
- Post town: SPALDING
- Postcode district: PE12
- Dialling code: 01406
- Police: Lincolnshire
- Fire: Lincolnshire
- Ambulance: East Midlands
- UK Parliament: South Holland and The Deepings

Holbeach Clough (today synonymous with Saracen's Head) is a fenland village in the South Holland district of Lincolnshire, England. It is just under 2 miles (3 km) north from the market town of Holbeach, and on the A17 road. The village is almost conjoined at the east to the village of Holbeach Bank. The village is part of the Holbeach civil parish, and is at the south-west edge of Holbeach Marsh.

== History ==
Holbeach Clough is also known as Saracen's Head, with late 18th- and early 19th-century maps including both names. Saracen's Head might be associated with two public houses of that name that existed at the settlement—and still exist in modern form—one for perhaps 400 years, the name possibly taken from the coat of arms of significant local Willoughby, Irby, or Littlebury families. The Saracen's Head public house might have served travellers and traders crossing the then wide estuary of the River Welland to Fosdyke. The Anglo-Saxon coastline of the area ran immediately north of Holbeach Clough until a dike, the Roman Bank, was constructed for land reclamation in the 14th century, this running from the west at Moulton Seas End. The Saracen's Head Ward of the local council covers Holbeach Clough.

Two previous Wesleyan Methodist chapels in the village are now demolished. The first was built in 1825, closed in 1971, and demolished in 1998. The second was built in 1866, closed in 1946, and demolished in 1978. Both were of brown brick with hipped slate roof.

In 1855 occupations in the village included a farmer, a butcher, a beer retailer, a shopkeeper, and the landlord of the Three Tuns public house. The Three Tuns was listed in 1872 along with a further beer house and a shopkeeper, these also in 1885 with the addition of a grocer and a shoemaker. By 1933 listed occupations were a farmer, a cottage farmer, a bulb grower, a smallholder, a beer retailer and the landlady of the Pear Tree public house at Penny Hill (half a mile south of Holbeach Clough), a further beer retailer, and two further smallholders. The Three Tuns was still in existence.

In the 1870s South Lincolnshire Fen-country coursing meetings were held on Holbeach Marsh, centred on Holbeach Clough.
