= Fleet, Lincolnshire =

Village and electoral ward in Lincolnshire, England

Coordinates: 52.792758°N 0.058331°E

Fleet
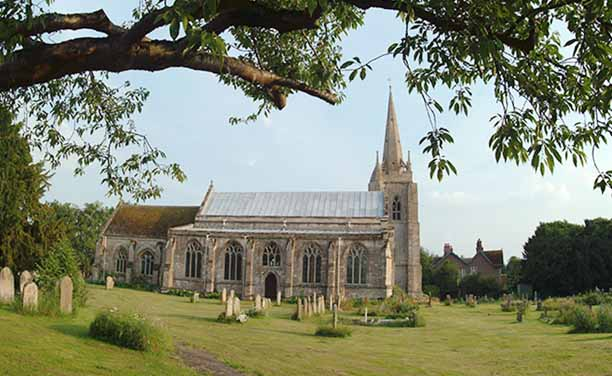
- Church of St Mary Magdalene, Fleet

- Location within Lincolnshire
- Population: 2,136 (2011)
- OS grid reference: TF388236
  - London: 85 mi (137 km) S
- District: South Holland
- Shire county: Lincolnshire
- Region: East Midlands
- Country: England
- Sovereign state: United Kingdom
- Post town: Spalding
- Postcode district: PE12
- Police: Lincolnshire
- Fire: Lincolnshire
- Ambulance: East Midlands
- UK Parliament: South Holland and the Deepings

Fleet is a village, civil parish and electoral ward in the South Holland district of Lincolnshire, England. It lies on Delph Bank, 3 miles (4.8 km) south-east from Holbeach. The population of the civil parish, including Fleet Hargate, at the 2011 census was 2136.

== History ==
In 1086, Fleet was listed as Fleot (Old English: the stream, estuary or creek), in the wapentake of Elloe in the Parts of Holland of Lincolnshire.

The Grade I listed Church of England parish church, dating from the late 12th century, is dedicated to St Mary Magdalene. The 120 feet (37 m) church tower with spire is detached from the nave by 15 feet (4.6 m). The fabric is mainly Decorated in style, with Early English arcades and a Perpendicular west window. According to Cox (1916), the church was restored in 1860, when the chancel was rebuilt, although the canopied sedilia was retained. In 1964 Pevsner noted 1798 repairs and considered the church "over-restored". He dated a chancel rebuild to 1843, questioned if it was "done correctly", and recorded Victorian tracery in the aisle windows, a blocked doorway to a previous chapel in the chancel, "fine busts of great variety", a Decorated-style sedilia and piscina with ogee arches and crocketed gables, a reredos dated 1790, and a defaced 14th-century effigy.

Pevsner also recorded an 1854 red-brick rectory (now Battleford Hall) designed by Benjamin Ferrey and restored in 2005 by the then owners Steve Holmes and Peter Day. A motte south-west of the village where 11th- and 12th-century pottery has been found. The English Heritage record for the now ploughed-down motte site details finds from the Iron Age to the 18th century.

== See also ==
- Fleet Hargate, a village within Fleet civil parish.
- Gedney, a village and civil parish to the east.
