= Gedney Broadgate =

Hamlet in Lincolnshire, England

Coordinates: 52.780547°N 0.081014156°E

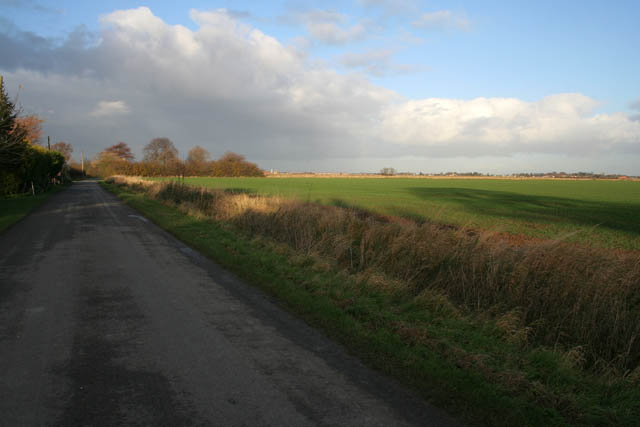
- Hunts gate, view toward Harford gate

- Location within Lincolnshire
- OS grid reference: TF404223
  - London: 90 mi (140 km) S
- District: South Holland
- Shire county: Lincolnshire
- Region: East Midlands
- Country: England
- Sovereign state: United Kingdom
- Post town: SPALDING
- Postcode district: PE12
- Dialling code: 01406
- Police: Lincolnshire
- Fire: Lincolnshire
- Ambulance: East Midlands
- UK Parliament: South Holland and The Deepings

Gedney Broadgate is a hamlet in the civil parish of Gedney and the South Holland district of Lincolnshire, England. It is situated west from the A17 road, 1 mile (1.6 km) south from Gedney, and 1.5 miles (2.4 km) west from Long Sutton. It includes the area known as Harford Gate.

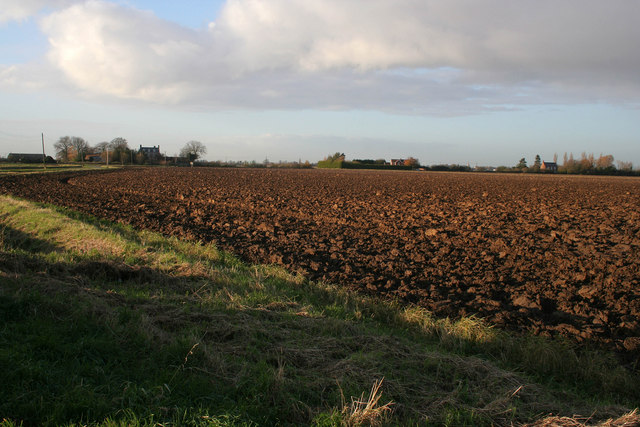
Looking towards Harford Gate, Gedney Broadgate

Gedney Bargate was established after the Norman Conquest at the end of the 11th century. At Gedney Bargate was the start point of the earliest medieval post-conquest fen dyke (sea defence bank), being mentioned in a 1226-27 charter.

By 1839 there existed a Baptist chapel in the hamlet, which closed in 1986. Pevsner mentions the 1839 chapel and the existence of "a couple of 18th-century cottages, one still thatched," and Broadgate House, dated 1824. The thatched cottage, at Harford Gate, is a mid-18th-century rendered red-brick Grade II listed building. A further Grade II listed building is the mid-18th-century red-brick Pulvertoft Hall at Harford Gate.

The drainage of land around Gedney Broadgate is now the responsibility of the South Holland Internal Drainage Board, Part of the Water Management Alliance, formerly known as the King’s Lynn Consortium of Internal Drainage Boards.
