= Holbeach St Matthew =

Village in Lincolnshire, England

Coordinates: 52.870788°N 0.093000°E

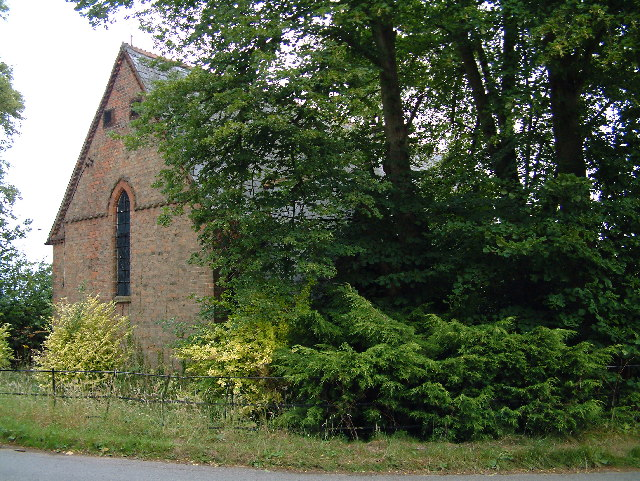
- St Matthew's Church, Holbeach St Matthews

- Location within Lincolnshire
- OS grid reference: TF394270
  - London: 100 mi (160 km) S
- District: South Holland
- Shire county: Lincolnshire
- Region: East Midlands
- Country: England
- Sovereign state: United Kingdom
- Post town: Spalding
- Postcode district: PE12
- Police: Lincolnshire
- Fire: Lincolnshire
- Ambulance: East Midlands
- UK Parliament: South Holland and The Deepings

Holbeach St Matthew is a small fenland village in the South Holland district of southern Lincolnshire, England. It lies 6 miles (10 km) north-east from Holbeach, 1 mile (1.6 km) south from The Wash, and within Holbeach Marsh.

In 1885 Kelly’s noted that the village was in the ecclesiastical parish of Holbeach Marsh, that a school for 72 children was about to be built, that its area was of 9,240 acres (37.4 km^{2}), and had an 1881 population of 743. The hamlet's chapel of ease, dedicated to St Matthew, was built 1868-69 by Ewan Christian in Early English style, and was capable of holding 110 persons. It is constructed of brick, has a combined nave and chancel, a south porch, and an east of nave turret with bell. The chapel, now redundant, has been converted to residential use.
