= Holbeach Marsh =

Fenland area in Lincolnshire, England

Coordinates: 52.849°N 0.062°E

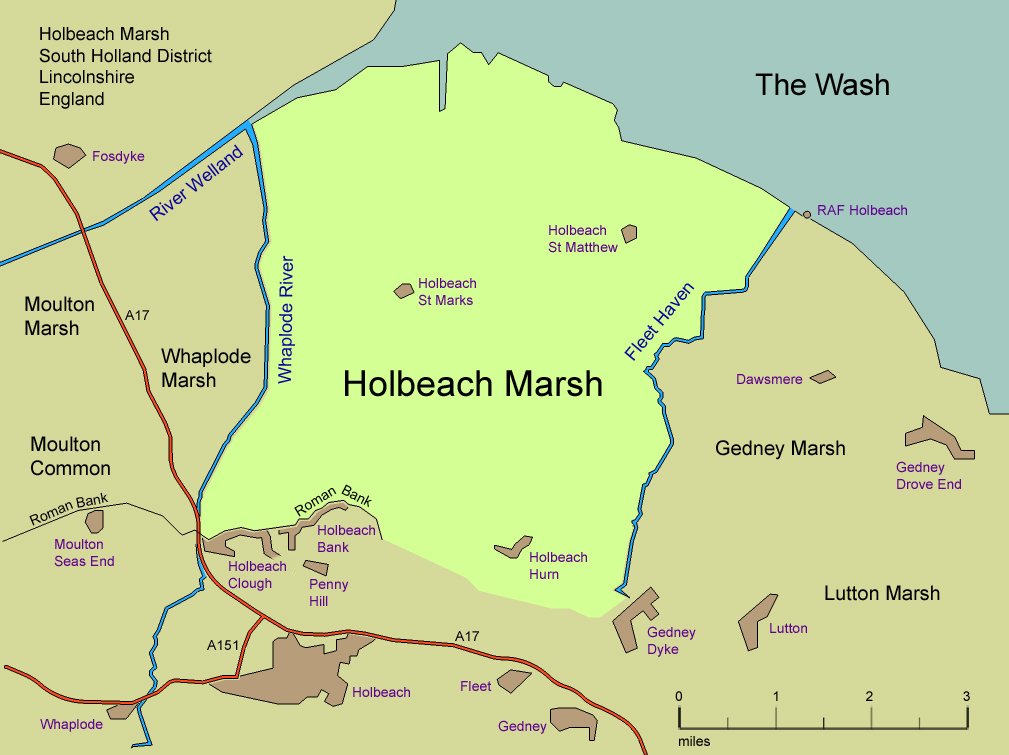
- Extent of Holbeach Marsh

- Location within Lincolnshire
- OS grid reference: TF3930
  - London: 90 mi (140 km) S
- District: South Holland
- Shire county: Lincolnshire
- Region: East Midlands
- Country: England
- Sovereign state: United Kingdom
- Post town: SPALDING
- Postcode district: PE12
- Dialling code: 01406
- Police: Lincolnshire
- Fire: Lincolnshire
- Ambulance: East Midlands
- UK Parliament: South Holland and The Deepings

Holbeach Marsh is a fenland area in the South Holland district of Lincolnshire, England.

Holbeach Marsh is situated between the market town of Holbeach on the A17 road at the south, and The Wash estuary at the north, and is bounded by the waterways of the Whaplode (Holbeach) River at the west, and Fleet Haven at the east. The area comprises approximately 14,500 acres (59 km^{2}) of arable farms, dispersed buildings, and small settlements. The marsh villages of Holbeach Bank and Holbeach Clough—or Saracens Head—are at the south-west edge, and Gedney Dyke at the south-east. Within the Marsh are the villages and hamlets of Holbeach St Marks, Holbeach St Matthew, and Holbeach Hurn. At the north-east on The Wash saltmarsh is the bombing range of RAF Holbeach.

== History ==
In 1810 a late 17th- or early 18th-century wooden coastal vessel, the Sea Venture, was beached and wrecked during a gale on the marshes just north of Holbeach St Matthew, while trading between Whitby and London.

Registered Holbeach Marsh electors entitled to vote in parliamentary elections for the Southern Division of Lincolnshire in 1841 numbered 18.

Historical trade directories include Marsh occupations in 1855 of publicans of the Harvest Man and Pear Tree public houses, a blacksmith, and 34 farmers; in 1885 a shopkeeper & beer retailer, a butcher who was also the proprietor of a public house, and 18 farmers, one of whom was also a land agent, and one a landowner; and in 1933 two farmers with 53 smallholders.

By the 1870s the Marsh was a centre for yearly South Lincolnshire Fen-country hare coursing competitions under St Leger open meetings. Beating on horseback was used to flush out the quarry.

Holbeach Marsh was an ecclesiastical district within Holbeach parish in the late 19th century, and had a population of 743.

In 1948 1,500 acres (6 km^{2}) of land was reclaimed from The Wash by the construction of an 11 feet (3.4 m)-high embankment, 6.5 miles (10.5 km) long, with a base of 64 feet (20 m) deep and a top of 9 feet (2.7 m). The bank took six months to build and used 500,000 tons of clay. The scheme was the work of three local farmers with the support of the Ministry of Agriculture, and cost £41,000.

Jane Cocking Glover (sometime literary contributor), and her family were resident at Holbeach Marsh before to emigrating to the United States.
