= Holbeach St Johns =

Village in Lincolnshire, England

Coordinates: 52.745957°N 0.010825°W

- Location within Lincolnshire
- OS grid reference: TF 34370 18337
  - London: 85 mi (137 km) S
- District: South Holland
- Shire county: Lincolnshire
- Region: East Midlands
- Country: England
- Sovereign state: United Kingdom
- Post town: Spalding
- Postcode district: PE12
- Police: Lincolnshire
- Fire: Lincolnshire
- Ambulance: East Midlands
- UK Parliament: South Holland and The Deepings

Holbeach St Johns is a small village in South Holland district of Lincolnshire, England. It is approximately 4 miles (6 km) south from the town of Holbeach, and 7 miles (11 km) south-east from the town of Spalding. There is a small airfield about 1 mile (1.6 km) to the west of the village.

The Greenwich Meridian runs through Holbeach St Johns.
