= List of general aviation activities =

The following are some of the activities that normally fall within the scope of general aviation, which encompasses all civil aviation other than scheduled air service:

- Aerial firefighting
- Aerial photography
- Aerobatics
- Air ambulance
- Air cargo flights
- Air charter
- Air racing
- Air shows
- Airship
- Air taxi
- Angel flights
- Ballooning
- Bush flying
- Commuter aircraft
- Crop dusting
- Business jet
- Experimental aircraft
- Fantasy flights
- Flight training
- Gliding
- Light aircraft
- Parachuting
- Pest control
- Photogrammetry
- Police aviation
- Search and rescue
- Small Aircraft Transportation System
- Tourism (Sightseeing)
- Traffic reporting
- Warbirds
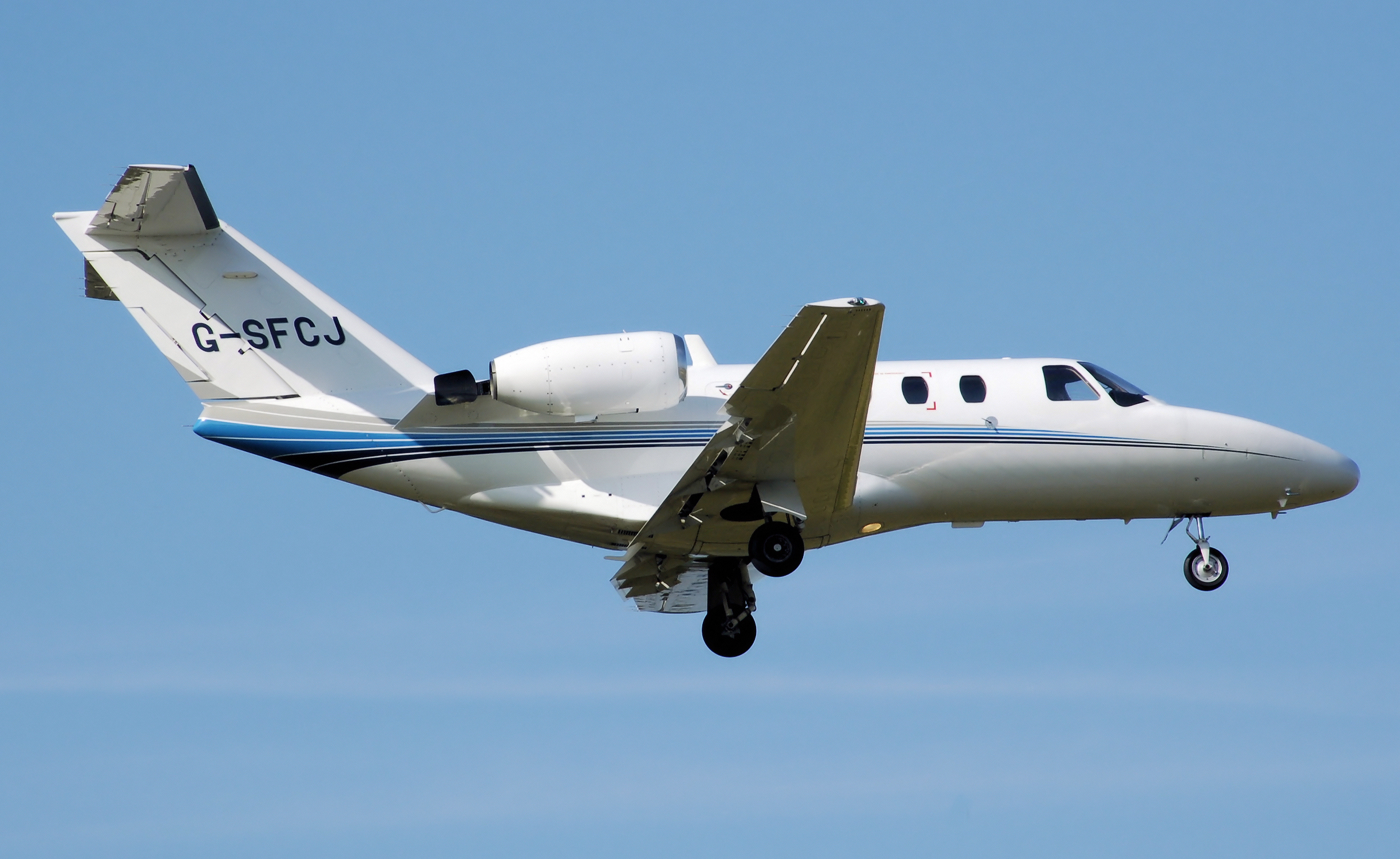
Business jet of the Cessna Citation family

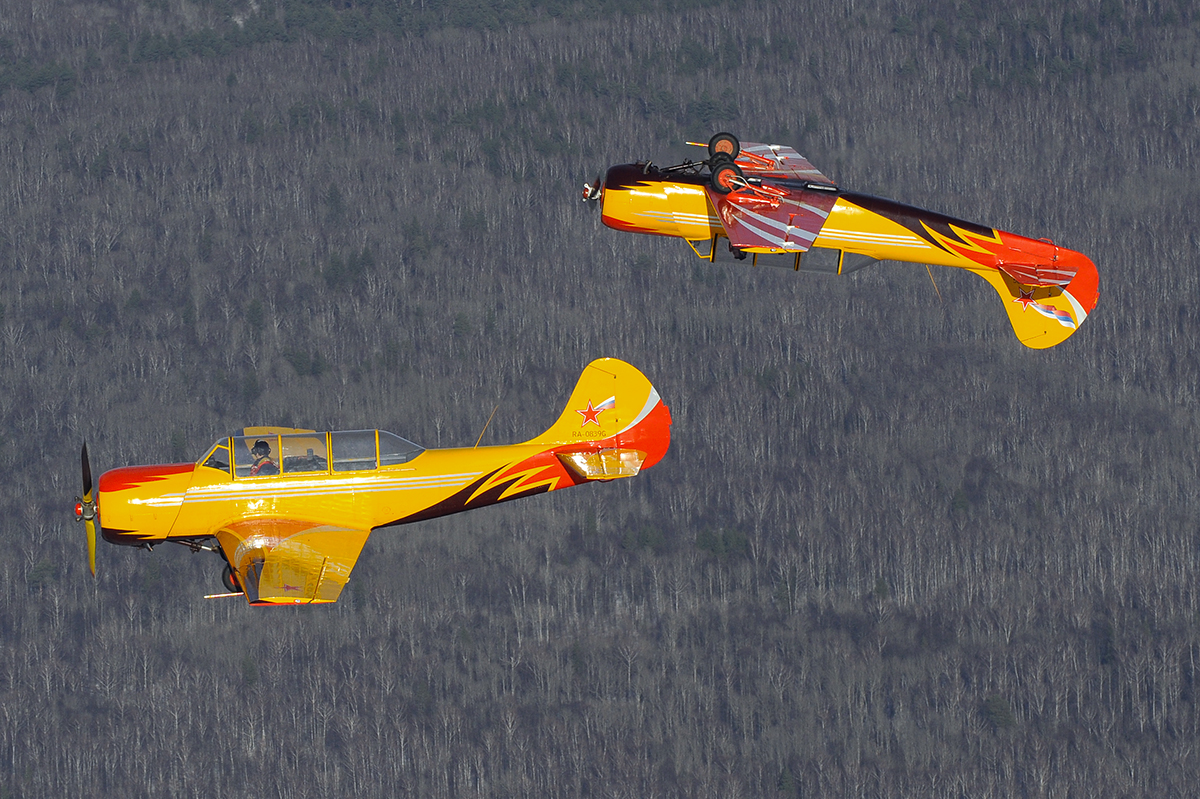
Two Yakovlev Yak-52 near Moscow

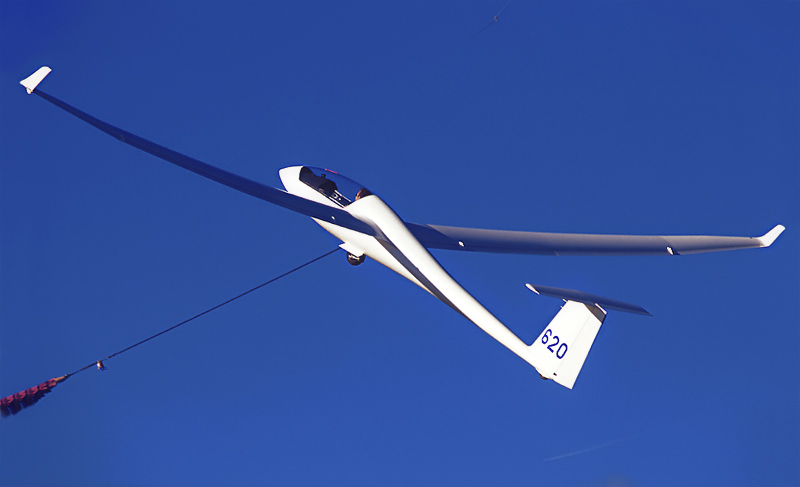
Sailplane winch launch

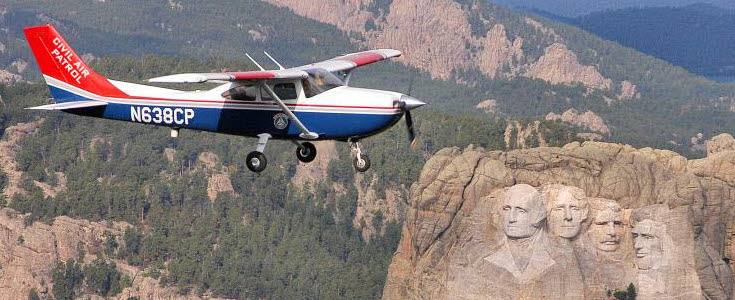
Cessna 182 of the US Civil Air Patrol
