= Paardenmarkt =

The Paardenmarkt bank is a sandbank in the North Sea some 300 to 1500 meters from the Belgian coast near Knokke-Heist and close to the port of Zeebrugge.

== Etymology ==
The oldest mention of the Paardenmarkt occurs in 1411. It was a market for horses on the former island of Wulpen. In 1377, a storm flood destroyed most of the island and in the All Saints Flood of 1570 the rest disappeared under the waves. Since the beginning of the 17th century on many charts the name Paardenmarkt has been used to indicate the shallows.

== Munition dump ==
After the First World War, from November 1919 to May 1920 some 35,000 tons of ammunition- of which some 10,000 tons were mostly German chemical ammunition (mustard gas)- was dumped by the Belgian authorities at the bank. The existence of the dump was forgotten until it was rediscovered in 1971. The dump is currently covered by some two to four meters of sand.

In 2013 after searching the government archives, scientists disputed the number as an underassessment and claimed that probably all 35,000 tons of the dumped munitions are chemical munitions, because after the war conventional munitions were usually disposed of by exploding them under controlled circumstances. However, at the time this was considered to be too risky for chemical weapons. Due to the high financial cost and for safety reasons the Belgian government has decided not to clear the area and practices a "don't touch" policy. The site is however marked with buoys and is constantly monitored, and is a prohibited area for fishery activity and for anchoring.

== See also ==
=== Bibliography ===
- Els M, Francken F, Coulier G & Parmentier K () Is TNT leaking into the North Sea ? .
- De Batist M, Missiaen T, Vanninen P, Soderstrom M et al. (2013). Aanbevelingen betreffende chemische monitoring. Studieopdracht DG5/INSPA/RMa/23.160, 88 pp.
- De Vos L, Mathys P & De Rouck J (2009). Studie “Haalbaarheid kapping” ter hoogte van de Paardenmarkt, een munitiestortplaats uit W.O-I. Studieopdracht DG5/INSPA/RMa/23.123, 49pp.
- Francken F & Ruddick K (2003). Ontwikkeling van een dispersiemodel voor de evaluatie van de impact op het leefmilieu van toxische producten afkomstig van chemische wapens die zich bevinden op de bodem van de zee (Paardenmarkt site). Studieopdracht DG5/ INSPA/RMa/22.472, 44 pp.
- Francken F & al.(2009) A Case Study in Modeling Dispersion of Yperite and CLARK I and II from Munitions at Paardenmarkt, Belgium | Marine Technology Society Journal, Volume 43, Number 4, Automne 2009, pp. 52–61(10) | DOI: https://doi.org/10.4031/MTSJ.43.4.3 |(résumé)
- Francken F, Ruddick K & Roose P (2006). Studie naar de dispersie van CLARK I & II, afkomstig van chemische wapens die zich bevinden op de bodem van de zee. Studieopdracht DG5/INSPA/RMa/23.059, 27 pp.
- Missiaen T & Henriet J-P. et l'équipe d'évaluation du Paardenmarkt Project Team (2001), Evaluatie van de Paardenmarkt Site. DWTC Final Report, Project MN/02/88, 185 pp.
- Missiaen T & Henriet J.P (2002). Chemical munition dump sites in coastal environments. Federal Office for Scientific and Cultural Affairs (OSTC), Brussels, Belgium.
- Missiaen T (2010). Synthese van het wetenschappelijk onderzoek dat werd uitgevoerd op de Paardenmarktsite en formuleren van aanbevelingen m.b.t. de verdere aanpak. Studieopdracht DG5/INSPA/RMa/23.132, 112 pp.
- Missiaen T (2013). Le Paardenmarkt, une décharge de munitions de la 1ère GM devant la côte belge. DE GROTE REDE, 36, 53-60.
- Missiaen T (2013). Paardenmarkt Bank, a WWI ammunition dump site off the Belgian coast. DE GROTE REDE, 36, 53-60.
- Zanders J.P (1993) The destruction of old chemical munitions in Belgium; The Trench
