= Gedney, Lincolnshire =

Village and electoral ward in Lincolnshire, England

Coordinates: 52.7978°N 0.0798°E

Gedney
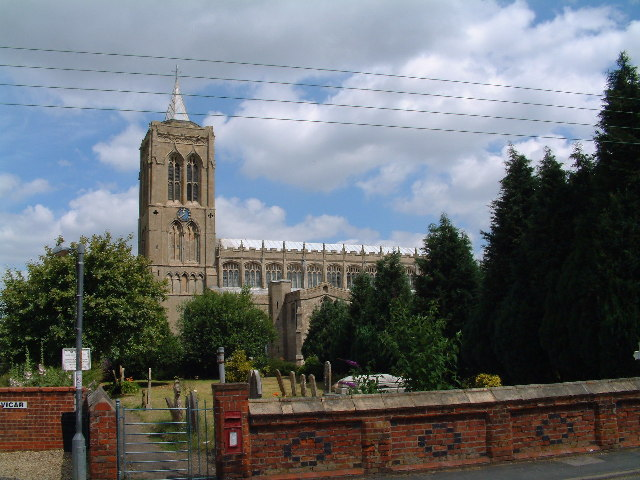
- Gedney St Mary Magdalene church – the Cathedral of the Fens

- Location within Lincolnshire
- Population: 2,351 (2011)
- OS grid reference: TF405243
  - London: 90 mi (140 km) S
- District: South Holland
- Shire county: Lincolnshire
- Region: East Midlands
- Country: England
- Sovereign state: United Kingdom
- Post town: SPALDING
- Postcode district: PE12
- Dialling code: 01406
- Police: Lincolnshire
- Fire: Lincolnshire
- Ambulance: East Midlands
- UK Parliament: South Holland and The Deepings

Gedney is a village, civil parish and electoral ward in the South Holland district of Lincolnshire, England. It is just to the south of the A17, from Boston to King's Lynn, 2 miles (3.2 km) east from Holbeach, and 2 miles (3.2 km) north-west from Long Sutton. The parish stretches east to The Wash and its villages and hamlets include Dawsmere, Gedney Broadgate, Gedney Drove End, Gedney Dyke, Gedney Marsh, and the geographic extension of Gedney Church End.

== History ==
A hospital for five paupers, of St Thomas Martyr, was founded at Gedney and served from North Creake. It was dissolved in around 1339.

The redundant railway station, which was on the former east to west Midland and Great Northern Joint Railway, closed in 1959.

The Red House windfarm, which was built in 2006, has six MM82 wind turbines to produce 12MW of power to supply 6,500 homes.

== Geography ==
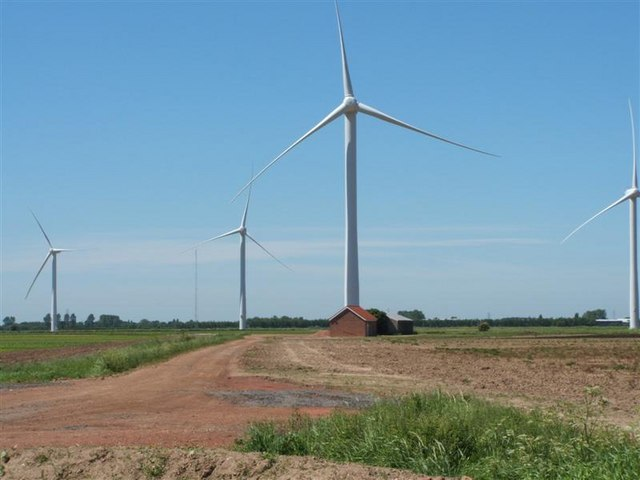
Gedney Marsh Wind Farm

Gedney and its parish lies on reclaimed fenland and is one of the most intensive crop-growing areas in the UK.

To the west, the parish begins at the eastern end of the Fleet Hargate bypass, and includes the village's campsite and houses, and borders the parish of Fleet. Its boundary is close to the west of Gedney Dyke, meets the parish of Holbeach, and passes just to the west of Gedney Dyke Farm before it follows Fleet Haven, near to the windfarm to the west of Red House Farm.

It deviates to the east from Fleet Haven and passes to the west of (another) Red House Farm then rejoins Fleet Haven just south of Wards Farm. Fleet Haven runs out of land and meets the sea wall. In the parish, and close to the east is the base of RAF Holbeach which is accessed via Durham's Road. The parish extends out on the mud flats along Fleet Haven Outfall. To access the part of the parish along the start of The Wash would be extremely foolish and is out of bounds due to the bombing range. The limit of the parish finishes between Gat Sea End and Old South Middle. There are observation towers on the sea wall for the bombing range. The control tower is on the sea wall towards Dawsmere and Gedney Drove End. Dawsmere Creek extends out towards The Wash. The boundary with Lutton is along Boatmere Creek then extends out to sea along Tycho Wing's Channel, which is the outflow of the River Nene. This area is the far west of The Wash NNR.

The boundary passes to the north of Lodge Farm, broadly following Boatmere Creek, south of Boat Mere Farm then along The Chase. It crosses Roman Bank at Sutton Corner, passing to the west of Lutton. It follows Docking's Holt Lane to the west of Long Sutton, meeting the B1359 at the Garnsgate Road junction. It follows the B1359 (former A17) to the west, then crosses the A17 then follows a drain and Garnsgate Road where it borders Long Sutton and partly follows National Cycle Route 1. It passes to the north of Moorswood Farm, then follows Benderslough Drove and then the South Holland Main Drain, where it borders Sutton St James to the south. At Leedsgate Bridge, west of Inley Drove Farm, it meets the parish of Fleet.

North of Leedsgate Bridge, the parish follows Fleet Drain, to the left of Rookery Farm, and it crosses the B1165 and the Little South Holland Drain at Raven's Gate Bridge. The boundary follows Fleet Drain north-eastwards alongside Raven's Drove. The two sides of the boundary are respectively known as Fleet Fen and Gedney Fen. Fleet Drain also follows Delph Bank. To the east of Fleet Drain at this point is Gedney Broadgate.

== Church ==
Gedney Grade I listed Anglican parish church is dedicated to St Mary Magdalene. Originating in the 13th century, additions and alterations carried-on into the 17th. It was considerably restored in 1890 however the spire to the tower was unfinished and left as a stump. The tower, 86 feet (26 m) to its parapet, has Early English lower stages and Perpendicular upper. The nave arcades and the chancel are of Decorated style. During the rebuilding of the south aisle in 1890 a brass of a female (ca. 1390), with a puppy at her feet, was discovered. Also in the south aisle is a damaged 13th-century effigy of a cross-legged knight, conjectured to represent Falco D'Oyry, and Jacobean alabaster monuments of Adlard Welby, his wife Cassandra and their five children, erected in 1605. The south porch has a rare upper chamber. At the east end of the north aisle are the remains of a 14th-century Jesse window.

The church had 29 windows damaged in 2006, including its Jesse window, when its vestments and an altar cloth were set alight. Two culprits, who were aged 15 and 16 years old, admitted to police that they had caused the damage.

== Amenities ==
Public houses in the parish are the Chequers on Gedney Dyke Main Street, and the Grade II listed Old Black Lion in Chapelgate, and The Rising Sun.
