= Holbeach =

Market town in Lincolnshire, England

Coordinates: 52.8037°N 0.0154°E

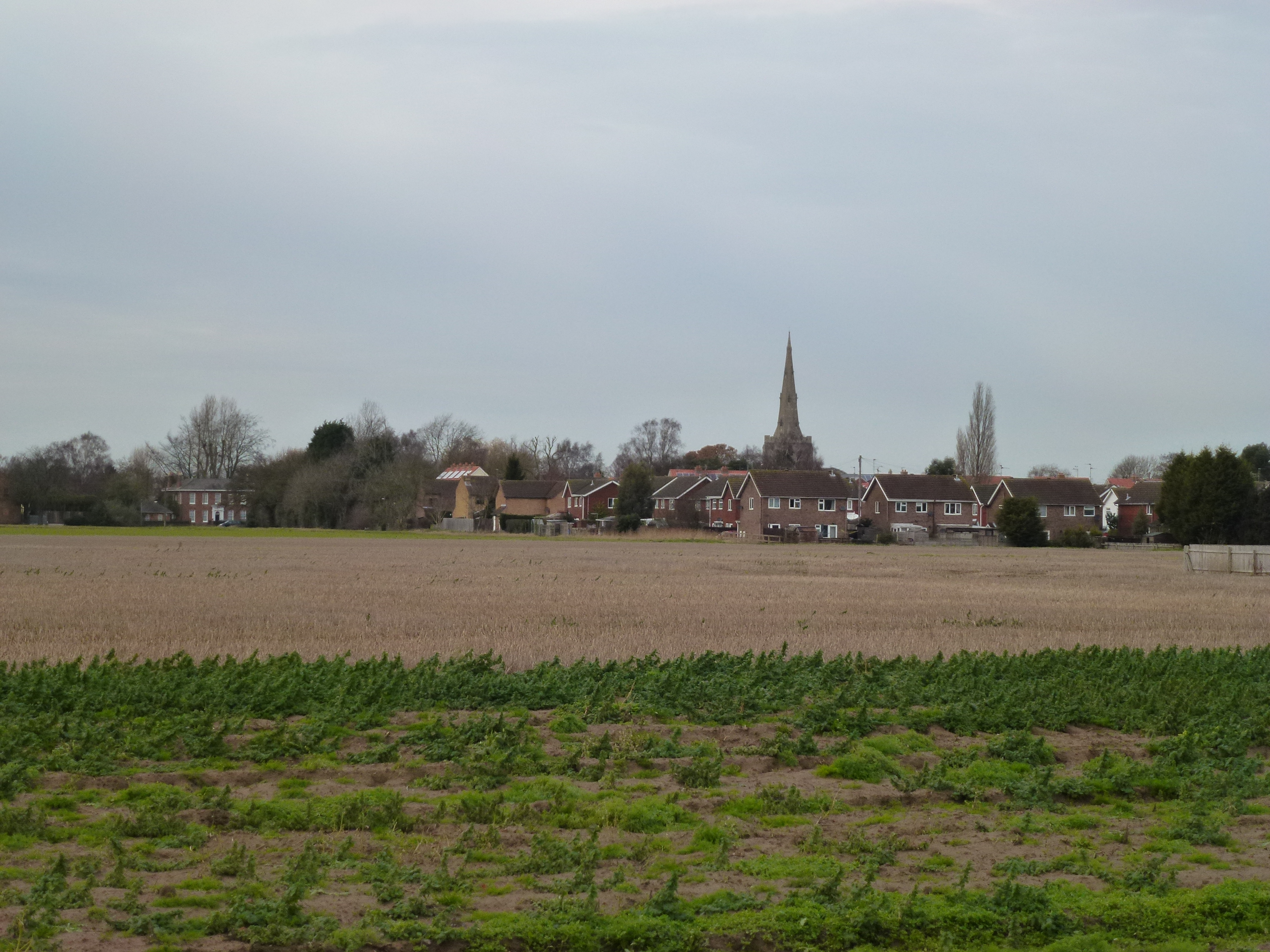
- Skyline of Holbeach

- Location within Lincolnshire
- Population: 11,186 (2021)
- OS grid reference: TF358248
  - London: 85 mi (137 km) S
- Civil parish: Holbeach
- District: South Holland
- Shire county: Lincolnshire
- Region: East Midlands
- Country: England
- Sovereign state: United Kingdom
- Post town: SPALDING
- Postcode district: PE12
- Dialling code: 01406
- Police: Lincolnshire
- Fire: Lincolnshire
- Ambulance: East Midlands
- UK Parliament: South Holland and The Deepings

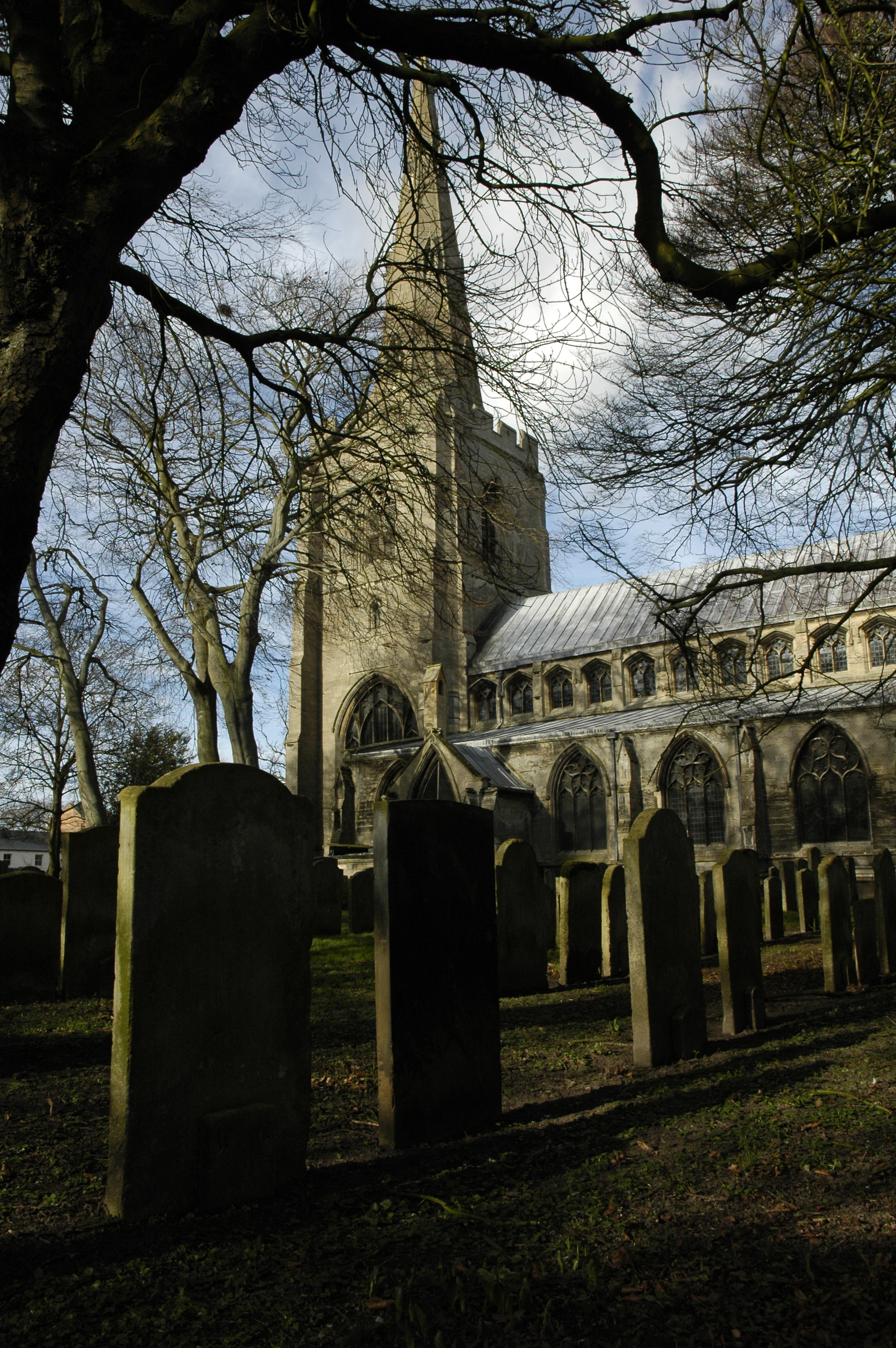
All Saints Church, Holbeach

Holbeach is a market town and civil parish in the South Holland District in Lincolnshire, England. The town lies 8 miles (13 km) from Spalding; 17 miles (27 km) from Boston; 20 miles (32 km) from King's Lynn; 23 miles (37 km) from Peterborough; and 43 miles (69 km) by road from Lincoln. It is on the junction of the A151 and A17.

The Prime Meridian of the world passes through the west of Holbeach and is marked with a millstone at Wignals Gate.

== History ==
A number of Roman and Romano-British pottery finds have been made in and about the town.

The name Holbeach derives from the Old English holbæc meaning 'hollow ridge'.

The town's market charter was awarded in 1252 to Thomas de Moulton, a local baron. All Saints' Church was built in the 14th century and the porch, which was built around 1700, possibly incorporated parts of de Moulton's ruined castle. The associated All Saints' Hospital, for a warden and fifteen poor persons, was founded by Sir John of Kirton, in 1351. It had ceased to exist before the suppression of chantries and hospitals. The antiquarian William Stukeley reported that his father removed the ruins from the site which is now occupied by the Chequers Inn.

Until the beginning of the 17th century, the sea came to within 2 miles (3.2 km) of the town and there were severe floods recorded in the 13th and 16th centuries. The land drainage programmes that followed moved the coastline of the Wash to 9 miles (14 km) away, leaving Holbeach surrounded by more than 23,000 acres (93 km^{2}) of reclaimed fertile agricultural land. In 1615, nominees of the Earl of Argyll were entitled to the land which was reclaimed from the sea in Wigtoft, Moulton, Whaplode, Holbeach and Tydd St Mary. The Earl paid for the work, but differences of opinion stalled the project after 1634. Further enclosure of marshes were recorded in 1660, in Gedney, Whaplode, Holbeach and Moulton. The work included the building of an embankment, and resulted in 9,798 acres (39.65 km^{2}) being added to Holbeach parish. A second embankment was built under the provisions of the South Holland Embankment Act (1793) and added another 2,059 acres (8.33 km^{2}). Following unsuccessful attempts in the 1830s, the rest of Holbeach Marsh was enclosed in 1840. The project was directed by Mr. Millington, and the total area added to the parish by all these enclosures was 12,390 acres (50.1 km^{2}).

In 1829 a theatre was built for Joseph Smedley as the 'Public Rooms' in Park Road. This was visited by the Lincoln Company, managed by Fanny Robertson, following their performances in Wisbech in 1841.

The Spalding and Norwich Railway, (later incorporated in the Midland and Great Northern Joint Railway), opened Holbeach railway station in 1862. Like the rest of the M&GN route, it closed to passengers in 1959 (before the Beeching Axe) and the line closed entirely in 1965.

The 19th century also saw the building of several small churches, including a Wesleyan chapel, built on Chapel Street in 1808, and a Baptist chapel, which was built on Albert Street in 1845 using red brick and colour-washed render.

The Second World War defences constructed at nearby Lawyers Creek comprise a number of pillboxes including the rare Ruck machine gun post.

== Geography ==
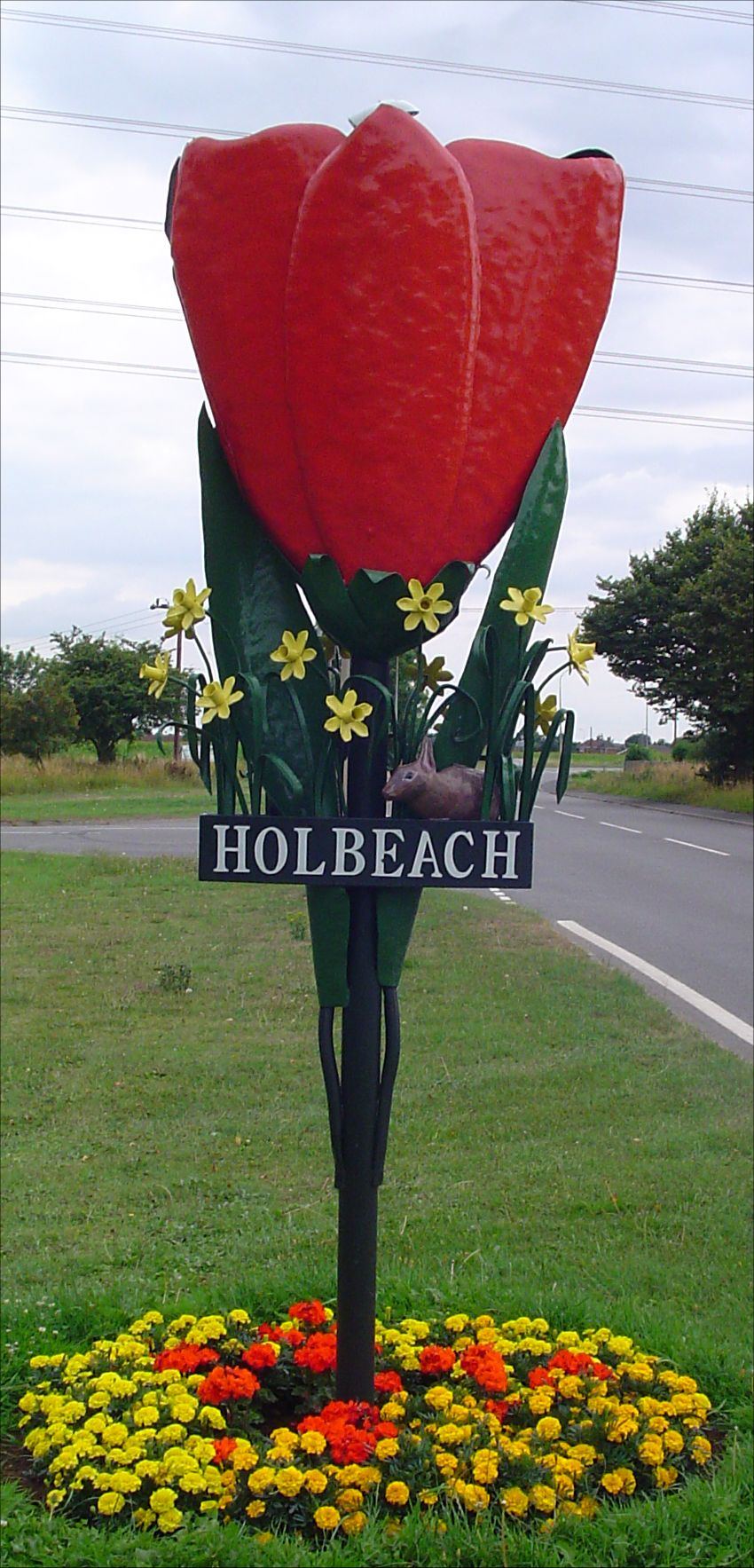
Holbeach's colourful town sign

The name "Holbeach" also applies to the civil parish of Holbeach. The parish is one of the largest by area in England, and extends from Cambridgeshire to the Wash, measuring 16 miles (26 km) north to south, and about 4 miles (6.4 km) east to west. The total population of the parish is almost 24,000 with approximately 10,000 in Holbeach town. The town has the most inhabitants and services compared to the villages surrounding it which incorporate its name.

Along with the town of Holbeach proper, the name is found in a number of villages in the Lincolnshire Fens: Holbeach Bank, Holbeach Clough, Holbeach Drove, Holbeach Fen, Holbeach Hurn, Holbeach St Johns, Holbeach St Marks and Holbeach St Matthew. This repetition of a name for a collection of close-lying villages is not unknown in the Fens: Gedney, Tydd, and Walpole are other examples.

The drainage of land around Holbeach is now the responsibility of the South Holland Internal Drainage Board, part of the Water Management Alliance, formerly known as the King's Lynn Consortium of Internal Drainage Boards.

== Economy ==
Much of the economy has been based on food processing and bulb growing. The United Kingdom's largest supplier of tulip and daffodil bulbs is situated to the north of the town and flour milling continues at Barrington Mill.

== Community ==
Local public houses are The Red Lion (newly renovated and reopened), The Horse & Groom, the Mansion House on High Street, and the Crown Hotel on West Street. Previous public houses were the Station Inn (Demolished and replaced with houses), the Chequers Hotel (newly renovated and reopened as Bar 912), the Exchange (now a residential property), The String of Horses (now a Hairdressers), The Ram (now a flower shop), The Bell Hotel (now Petite Street) and the Black Bull (now a fishing tackle shop).

The Royal Air Force maintains a bombing range, known officially as RAF Holbeach, on salt marshland at the coast of Holbeach parish, near the village of Gedney Drove End. The RAF station is situated approximately 11 miles (18 km) north-west of Holbeach town centre.

== Education ==
There are two primary schools in Holbeach – Holbeach Primary School and William Stukeley Church of England Primary School.

The local secondary school on Park Road was called the George Farmer Technology & Language College but, in September 2011, it became the University Academy Holbeach.

Holbeach is the base for a campus of the University of Lincoln, redeveloped in 2004 on the Park Road site of the former Holbeach Agricultural Centre and now known as the National Centre for Food Manufacturing. The campus specialises in food manufacturing technology.

== Media ==
Local news and television programmes are provided by BBC Yorkshire and Lincolnshire and ITV Yorkshire. Television signals are received from the Belmont TV transmitter. It is also possible to receive reception from the Waltham TV transmitter which broadcast BBC East Midlands and ITV Central, and Sandy Heath TV transmitter that broadcast BBC East and ITV Anglia.

The town is covered by both BBC Radio Cambridgeshire and BBC Radio Lincolnshire. Other radio stations including Greatest Hits Radio Lincolnshire and Hits Radio Lincolnshire. Tulip Radio operated from Spalding until 2017. The area is also one of the few in Lincolnshire to be covered by a local DAB multiplex, NOW Peterborough.

Local newspapers are Spalding Today and Spalding Voice.

== Sport ==
The local football club is Holbeach United, founded in 1929. The team plays in the United Counties League, part of the English football league system, and are known as the Tigers in reference to 'Fen Tigers', 18th-century local people who fought against the destruction of their way of life through the draining of the Fens.

Speedway racing took place at nearby Bell End at Whaplode St Catherine. Details of the events are sketchy and some reports suggest the venue had grass-surfaced straights and dirt-surfaced bends. The venue is known to have operated in the immediate post-war era but closed in 1948.

== Notable people ==
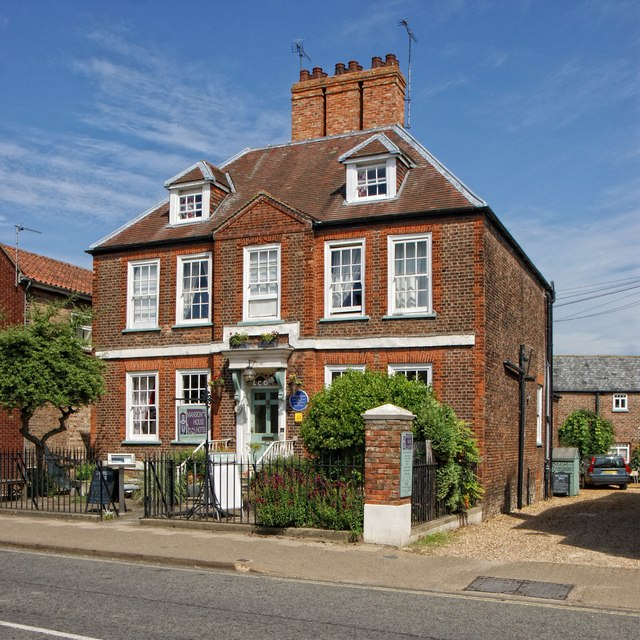
Mansion House, the birthplace of Norman Angell

- Norman Angell, Nobel Peace Prize winner, 1933
- Boz Burrell, bass guitarist, King Crimson and Bad Company
- Geoff Capes, shotputter and former World's Strongest Man
- Susanna Centlivre (c. 1667 to 1670 – 1 December 1723), born Susanna Freeman, was actress, and "the most successful female playwright of the eighteenth century"
- Henry Holbeach (c. 1477 – 2 August 1551), monk and Bishop of Lincoln
- Cyril Lowe, rugby union international, First World War flying ace, and supposedly the inspiration for W. E. Johns' character "Biggles"
- Walter Plowright, veterinary scientist who devoted his career to the eradication of the cattle plague rinderpest
- Christine Russell (née Carr), Labour MP for the City of Chester from 1997 to 2010.
- Stuart Storey, BBC sports commentator
- William Stukeley (1687–1765), antiquarian who pioneered the archaeological investigation of Stonehenge and Avebury, was born in the town

== Freedom of the Parish ==
The following people and military units have received the Freedom of the Parish of Holbeach.

=== Individuals ===
- Terrence Neville "Terry" Harrington: 13 August 2015.
