= Gedney Drove End =

Village in Lincolnshire, England

Coordinates: 52.8414°N 0.171350°E

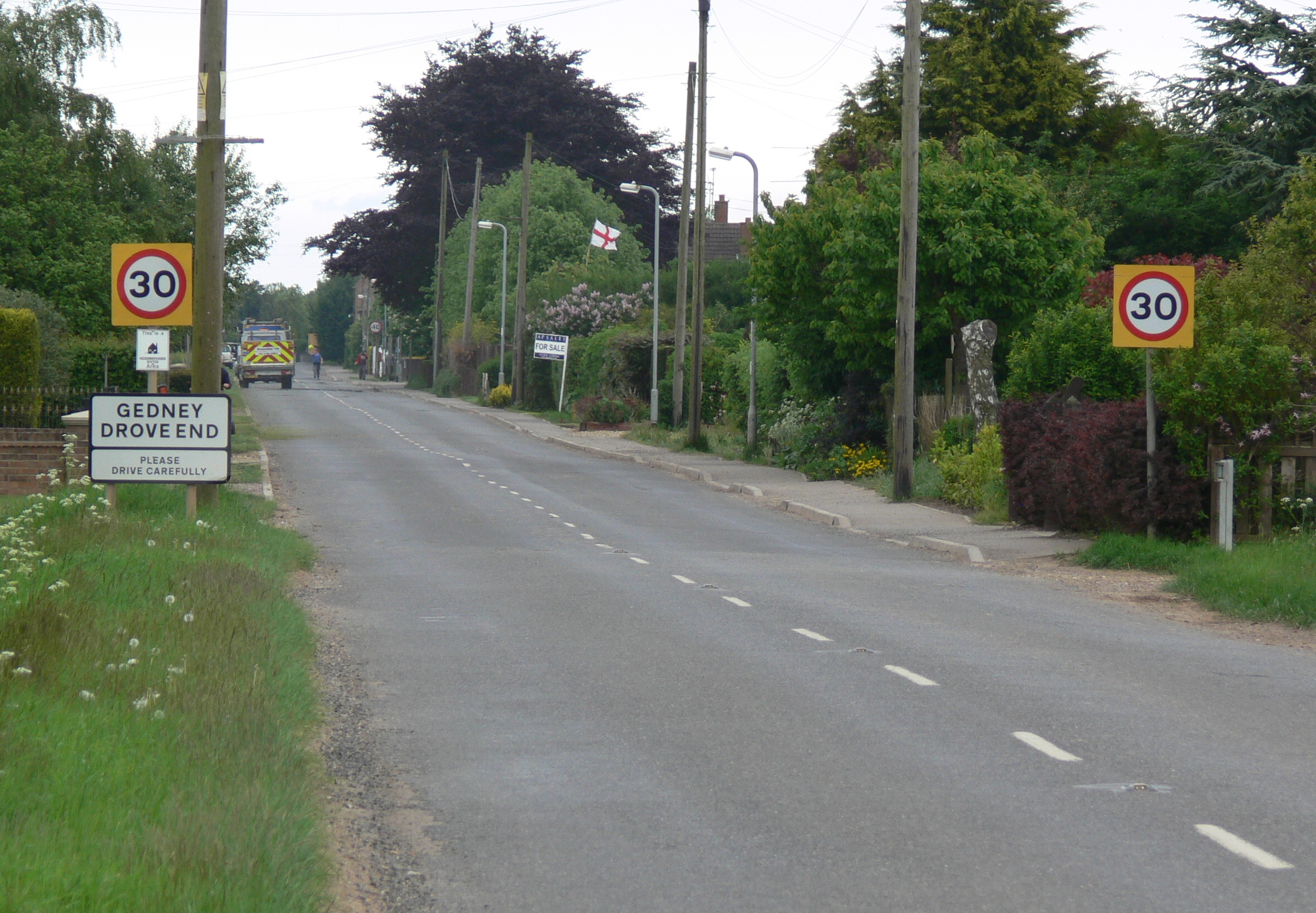
- B1359 road into Gedney Drove End

- Location within Lincolnshire
- OS grid reference: TF463293
  - London: 95 mi (153 km) S
- District: South Holland
- Shire county: Lincolnshire
- Region: East Midlands
- Country: England
- Sovereign state: United Kingdom
- Post town: SPALDING
- Postcode district: PE12
- Dialling code: 01406
- Police: Lincolnshire
- Fire: Lincolnshire
- Ambulance: East Midlands
- UK Parliament: South Holland and The Deepings

Gedney Drove End is a village in the civil parish of Gedney and the South Holland district of Lincolnshire, England. It is 40 miles (64 km) south-east from the city and county town of Lincoln, and 12 miles (20 km) from both Boston at the north-west and King's Lynn at the south-east.

Gedney Drove End is within Gedney Marsh, 5 miles (8 km) north-east from the parish village of Gedney, and 1 mile (1.6 km) from the south-west shore of The Wash estuary. The village is centred where Marsh Road runs into Dawsmere Road at the junction with Main Road, the B1359 road which runs from the village to Long Sutton. There is one public house, 'The Rising Sun' on Marsh Road; On Main Road is Gedney Drove Primary School. The village hall, which is shared with the neighbouring hamlet of Dawsmere, is on Dawsmere Road.

At the west of Gedney Drove End, separated by fields and at the centre of a farm, is Norfolk House, a Grade II listed red brick house dating to the early 19th century. At the north of the village, on the bank of The Wash is an infantry blockhouse from the Second World War. Further south-east off Marsh Road is a "Type 23 three-bay concrete anti-aircraft pillbox". At the centre of the village is evidence of Gedney Drove End post-medieval settlement, and the extant Methodist chapel dating to 1885. To the north of the village centre is the site of a former corn tower mill, non-existent by 1953.

== History ==
Gedney Drove was made an ecclesiastical district in 1855, and from then until 1870 services were held in the village schoolroom until the church at Dawsmere was built. Sunday afternoon services were held at a mission house in the village. In 1872 the Primitive Methodist Chapel was recorded. Occupations and trades at the time included a schoolmistress, eleven farmers, two coal dealers, a miller & baker, a further baker who was also the post master, a shoemaker, two carpenters, one of whom was also a wheelwright, a blacksmith, a grocer & draper, a boatman coastguard, the occupant of a beerhouse, and the licensed victualler of The Wheatsheaf public house.

Newspapers reported in 1906 that a silver cup, thought to be part of King John's lost treasure—believed to have vanished in the Wash on 12 October 1216—was found nearby by a Wisbech publican.
