= List of York sites of interest =

A list of prominent tourist attractions in York, England.

== City centre ==
- Assembly Rooms, a grand Palladian public space designed by Lord Burlington, 1731–32, lies behind a rebuilt 19th century facade.
- Bar Convent Museum
- Barley Hall run by York Archaeological Trust (YAT) (Note: (EH) English Heritage, (NT) National Trust, (YAT) York Archaeological Trust, (YMT) York Museums Trust)
- Bettys, tea rooms in St Helen's Square
- Black Swan, pub in Peasholme Green
- Blue Bell, pub in Fossgate
- City Walls and gateways (Bars)
  - Bootham Bar
  - Micklegate Bar, with the City Walls Experience (YAT)
  - Monk Bar
  - Walmgate Bar
- DIG: an archaeological adventure (formerly the Archaeological Resource Centre), in St Saviour's Church (YAT)
- Fairfax House, a Georgian house run by York Civic Trust
- JORVIK Viking Centre (YAT)
- The King's Manor, now part of the University of York
- The Mansion House, the Georgian house of York's Lord Mayors
- Medieval churches of York including:
  - All Saints' Church, North Street
  - Holy Trinity Church, Micklegate
  - St Denys's Church, Walmgate
  - St. Michael le Belfrey, where Guy Fawkes was baptised
  - St Olave's Church, Marygate
- Merchant Adventurers' Hall
- Merchant Taylors' Hall
- Museum Gardens (YMT)
  - St Mary's Abbey, ruins in the Museum Gardens (YMT)
  - Yorkshire Museum (YMT)
- National Centre for Early Music, in the medieval Church of St Margaret and home of the York Early Music Festival
- National Railway Museum
- River Ouse, with boat rides and crossed by several bridges
- St George's York
- The Shambles, York's best-preserved medieval street
- The Snickelways, a collection of narrow streets and passages
- Treasurer's House (NT)
- York Castle
  - Clifford's Tower (EH)
  - York Castle Museum (YMT)
- York City Art Gallery (YMT)
- York Dungeon
- York Minster
- York's Chocolate Story

== Outside York city centre ==
- Askham Bog
- Askham Bryan Hall
- Bishopthorpe Palace, home to the Archbishop of York
- Elvington Hall
- Goddards House and Garden (NT)
- Heslington Hall
- Holgate Windmill
- Lamel Hill
- Middlethorpe Hall, Middlethorpe Manor
- Osbaldwick Hall
- Skelton Hall, Skelton Manor
- Strays of York
- Vale of York
- York Cemetery
- York Cold War Bunker (EH)
- York Racecourse, situated on Knavesmire
- Yorkshire Air Museum, Elvington
- Yorkshire Museum of Farming, Murton
