= Lloyds Bank coprolite =

Fossilized piece of human dung from Viking-era York in England

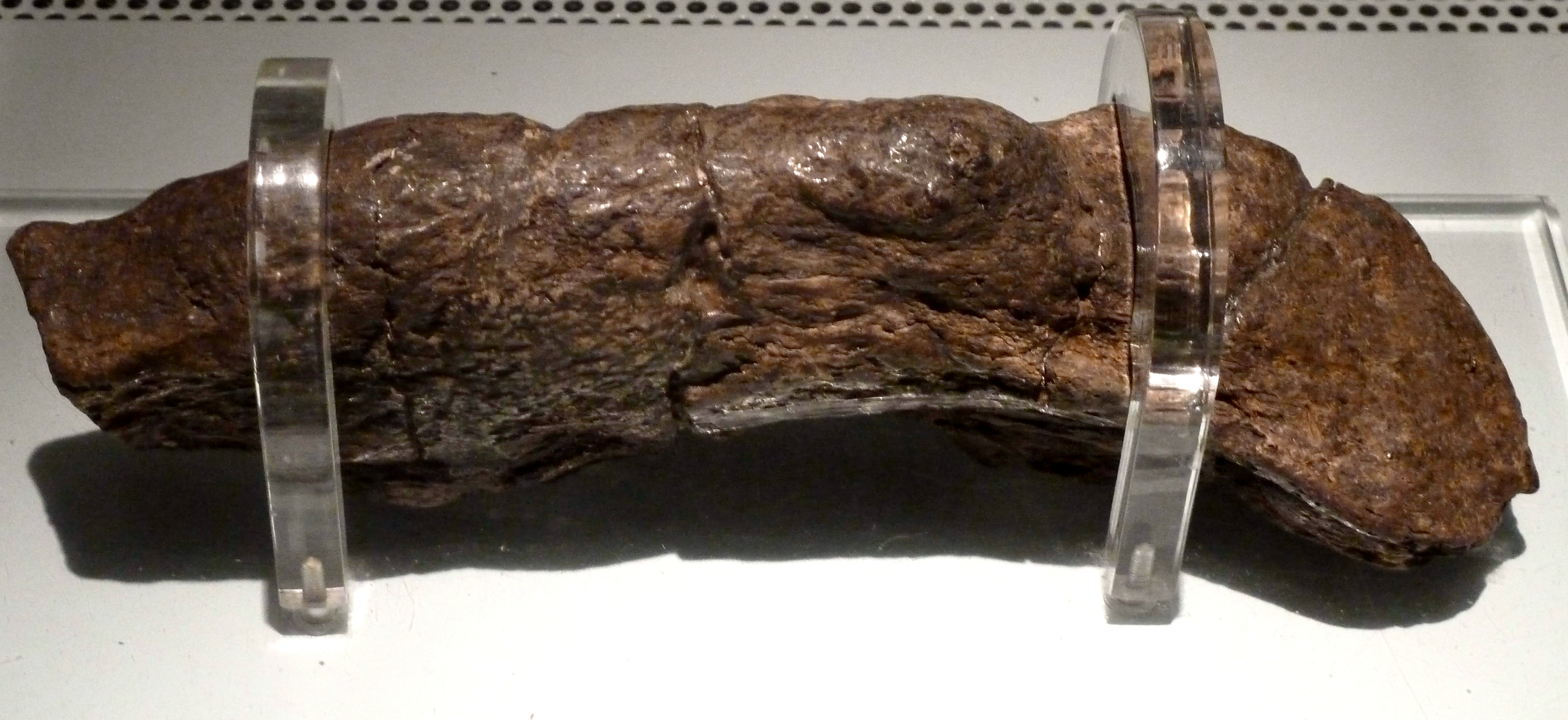
- On display at Jorvik Viking Centre
- Material: Palaeofaeces
- Created: 9th century
- Discovered: 1972 excavation, Pavement, York
- Present location: Jorvik Viking Centre

The Lloyds Bank coprolite is a large coprolite, or fossilised specimen of human faeces, recovered by the York Archaeological Trust while excavating the settlement of Jórvík (present-day York) in northern England. The specimen was dated around the 9th century and offers insight into the dietary practices of the Anglo-Scandinavians during this period.

== Description ==
The coprolite was found in 1972 beneath the site of what was to become the branch of Lloyds Bank on Pavement in York, and may be the largest example of fossilised human faeces (palaeofaeces) ever found, measuring 20 centimetres (8 in) long and 5 centimetres (2 in) wide. Analysis of the stool has indicated that its producer subsisted largely on meat and bread, despite evidence suggesting that other people at the same place and time had access to fruits, leeks, shellfish, and nuts. The stool had undergone mineralisation, unlike some other human coprolites which are preserved by desiccation. The presence of several hundred parasitic eggs suggests the person was riddled with intestinal worms (specifically maw-worms and whipworms). In 1991, Andrew Jones, a York Archaeological Trust employee and palaeoscatologist, made international news with his appraisal of the item for insurance purposes: "This is the most exciting piece of excrement I've ever seen ... In its own way, it's as irreplaceable as the Crown Jewels". The layers that covered the coprolite were moist and peaty. The archaeologists also recovered preserved timber, textiles and leather from the site.

== Display ==
The specimen was put on display at the Archaeological Resource Centre, an outreach and education centre run by the York Archaeological Trust. In 2003, the coprolite broke into three pieces after being dropped while being exhibited to a party of visitors, and efforts were undertaken to reconstruct it. It has been displayed at Jorvik Viking Centre since 2008.
