= Paleofeces =

Ancient human feces found in archaeological surveys

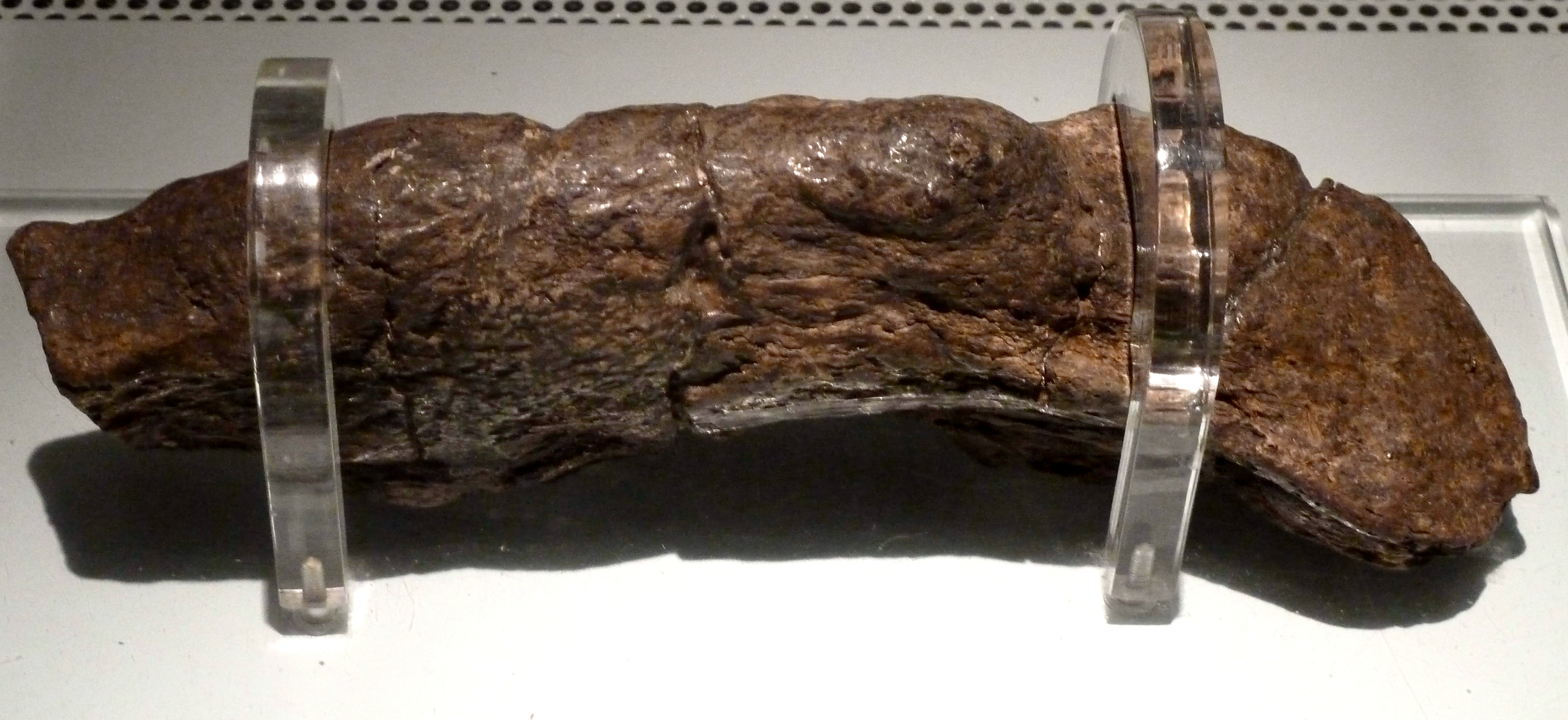
The 9th-century Viking Lloyds Bank coprolite, now at Jorvik Viking Centre, York

Paleofeces (or palaeofaeces in British English) are ancient human feces, often found as part of archaeological excavations or surveys. The term coprolite is often used interchangeably, although coprolite can also refer to fossilized animal feces. Intact feces of ancient people may be found in caves in arid climates and in other locations with suitable preservation conditions. They are studied to determine the diet and health of the people who produced them through the analysis of seeds, small bones, and parasite eggs found inside. The feces can contain information about the person excreting the material as well as information about the material itself. They can also be chemically analyzed for more in-depth information on the individual who excreted them, using lipid analysis and ancient DNA analysis. The success rate of usable DNA extraction is relatively high in paleofeces, making it more reliable than skeletal DNA retrieval.

The reason this analysis is possible at all is due to the digestive system not being entirely efficient, in the sense that not everything that passes through the digestive system is destroyed. Not all of the surviving material is recognizable, but some of it is. This material is generally the best indicator archaeologists can use to determine ancient diets, as no other part of the archaeological record is as direct an indicator.

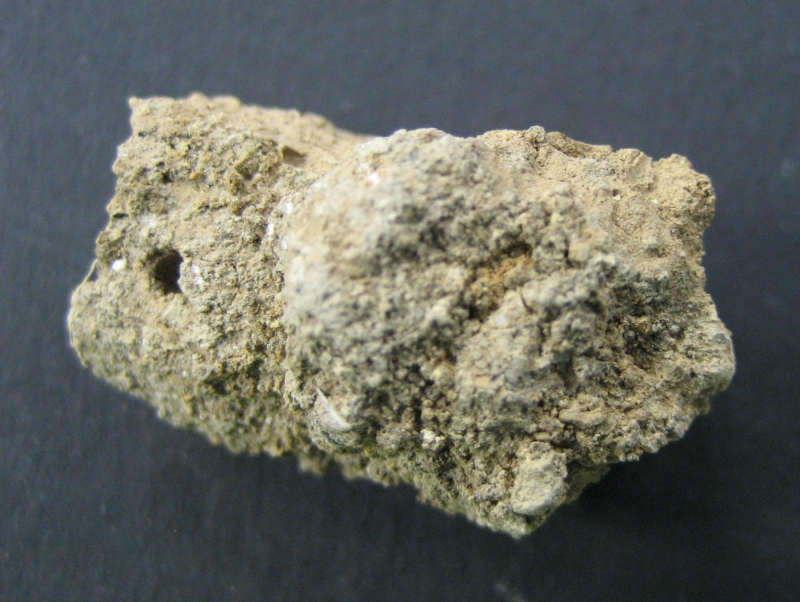
Human paleofeces from the Neolithic site at Çatalhöyük, Turkey. Picture from Lisa-Marie Shillito, Newcastle University UK

The process that preserves the feces in a way that they can be analyzed later is called the Maillard reaction. This reaction creates a casing of sugar that preserves the feces from the elements. To extract and analyze the information contained within, researchers generally have to freeze the feces and grind them up into powder for analysis.

== History of research ==
Analysis of archaeological feces has a relatively short history compared to many other archaeological materials. The founder of the discipline is Dr. Eric O. Callen, who pioneered the subject in the late 1950s to mid-1960s. His early papers used coprolite analysis to investigate early Mexican diets, published in The Prehistory of the Tehuacan Valley: Environment, and Subsistence. Despite his work showing promise, archaeological coprolite studies remained a niche topic, with few other researchers becoming involved. After Callen's sudden death in 1970, his work was continued by Vaughn Bryant at Texas A&M University, Department of Anthropology. Coprolite analysis gradually became a topic of serious study. Today coprolite analysis in archaeology has increased, and they have provided important evidence concerning the evolution of human health and diet, in the Americas and other parts of the world. One of the most famous examples is the coprolite from Paisley Caves, Oregon, which has provided some of the earliest evidence for the human occupation of North America.

== Methods of analysis ==
A wide variety of methods can be used to analyse ancient feces, ranging from microscopic to molecular. At a basic level the analysis of size and morphology can provide some information on whether they are likely to be human or from another animal. Analyzed contents can include those visible to the naked eye, such as seeds and other plant remains—to the microscopic, including pollen and phytoliths. Parasites in coprolites can give information on the living conditions and health of ancient populations. At the molecular level, ancient DNA analysis can be used both to identify the species and to provide dietary information. A method using lipid analysis can also be used for species identification, based on the range of fecal sterols and bile acids. These molecules vary between species according to gut biochemistry, and so can distinguish between humans and other animals.

An example of researchers using paleofeces for the gathering of information using DNA analysis occurred at Hinds Cave in Texas by Hendrik Poinar and his team. The fecal samples obtained were over 2,000 years old. From the samples, Poinar was able to gather DNA samples using the analysis methods recounted above. From his research Poinar found that the feces belonged to three Native Americans, based on mtDNA similarities to present day Native Americans. Poinar also found DNA evidence of the food they ate. There were samples of buckthorn, acorns, ocotillo, nightshade and wild tobacco. No visible remnants of these plants were visible in the fecal matter. Along with plant material, there were also DNA sequences of animal species such as bighorn sheep, pronghorn antelope, and cottontail rabbit.

This analysis of the diet was very helpful. Previously it was assumed that this population of Native Americans survived with berries being their main source of nutrients. From the paleofeces, it was determined that these assumptions were incorrect and in the approximately 2 days of food that are represented in a fecal sample, 2–4 animal species and 4–8 plant species were represented. The nutritional diversity of this archaic human population was rather extraordinary.

An example of the use of lipid analysis for identification of species is at the Neolithic site of Çatalhöyük in Turkey. Large midden deposits at the site are frequently found to contain fecal material either as distinct coprolites or compressed 'cess pit' deposits. This was initially thought to be from dogs on the basis of digested bone, however an analysis of the lipid profiles showed that many of the coprolites were actually from humans.

The analysis of parasites from fecal material within cesspits has provided evidence for health and migration in past populations. For example, the identification of fish tapeworm eggs in Acre in the Crusader period indicates that this parasite was transported from northern Europe. The parasite was rarely seen in the Levant area during this time but was common in Northern Europe. It is suggested that it was brought to the region by the incoming Europeans.

== See also ==
- Coprolite
- Coprostanol
- Stercobilin
