= Richard III Experience at Monk Bar =

Museum in the City of York, North Yorkshire, England

Coordinates: 53.96278°N 1.078471°W

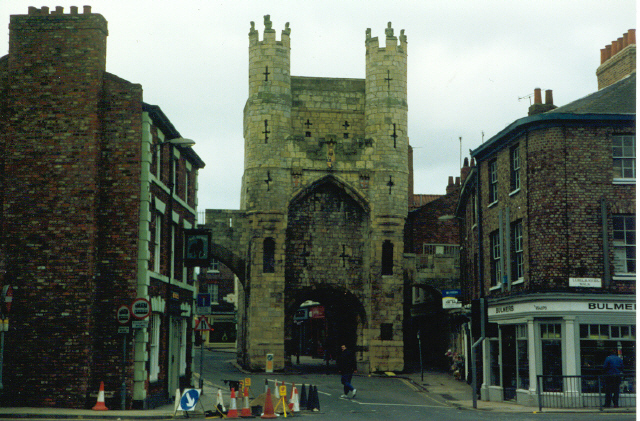
Monk Bar

location within York

The Richard III Experience at Monk Bar (formerly known as the Richard III Museum) was located in Monk Bar, the tallest of the four gatehouses in the historical city walls of York, England. It described the life of Richard III, the last king of the Plantagenet dynasty.

== Background ==
The museum explored Richard's early life, and the battles that raged between the houses of Lancaster and York during the Wars of the Roses. It described his reign and his death at the Battle of Bosworth, alongside multimedia presentations about the key battles of the Wars of the Roses. There was also arms and armour from his reign, including the only known fragment of a gun from that period.

In 2014, the York Archaeological Trust's Jorvik Group (which operates the Jorvik Viking Centre) took over the space within Monk Bar that had housed the Richard III Museum since 1993, and created "The Richard III Experience at Monk Bar". They also replaced the contents of the Micklegate Bar Museum and created "The Henry VII Experience at Micklegate Bar".

The museum, along with other visitor attractions operated by the Jorvik Group, closed in 2020 at the onset of the COVID-19 pandemic. When the group's larger sites reopened in July 2020 the Richard III and Henry VII experiences remained closed owing to their limited capacity for social distancing. The Henry VII Experience was replaced by the City Walls Experience which opened in April 2022. There is currently no museum operating in Monk Bar.

== See also ==
- King Richard III Visitor Centre, Leicester
