= Skelton, York =

Village and civil parish in North Yorkshire, England

Coordinates: 53.99780°N 1.13198°W

Skelton
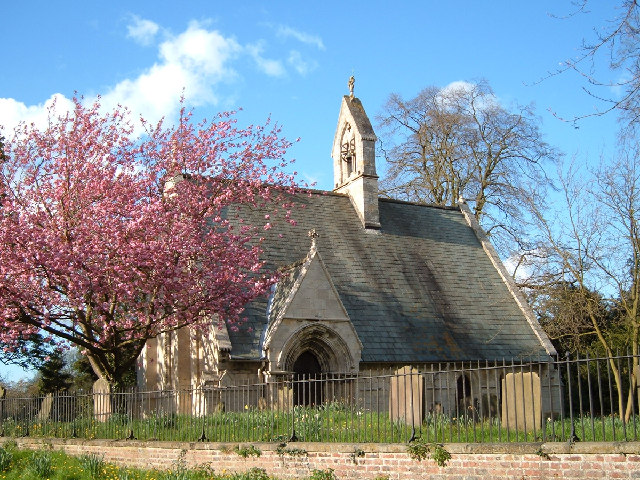
- St Giles Church, Skelton

- Location within North Yorkshire
- Population: 1,549 (2011 census)
- OS grid reference: SE570561
- Civil parish: Skelton
- Unitary authority: City of York
- Ceremonial county: North Yorkshire
- Region: Yorkshire and the Humber
- Country: England
- Sovereign state: United Kingdom
- Post town: YORK
- Postcode district: YO30
- Police: North Yorkshire
- Fire: North Yorkshire
- Ambulance: Yorkshire
- UK Parliament: York Outer

Skelton is a village and civil parish in the unitary authority of the City of York, in North Yorkshire, England. It is four miles (6.4 km) north-north-west of the city of York, west of Haxby, and on the east bank of the River Ouse. Skelton was in the ancient royal Forest of Galtres and covers 977.3 hectares (3.77 mi^{2}). Skelton was made a conservation area in 1973.

The village name probably began as the Anglo-Saxon 'Shelfton'—'the settlement on high ground'—becoming the present 'Skelton' under the invading Danes. The village, along with nearby Overton, is mentioned in the Domesday Book.

According to the 2001 census the parish had a population of 1,640, reducing to 1,549 at the 2011 census.

The village was historically part of the North Riding of Yorkshire until 1974. It was then a part of the district of Ryedale in North Yorkshire from 1974 until 1996. Since 1996 it has been part of the City of York unitary authority.

== History ==
Skelton is mentioned in the Domesday Book, but its name indicates Anglo-Saxon and Danish influences.

Skelton Grange was built by the Place family originally in the 18th century and rebuilt after fire in 1866. 'The Grange' was finally sold in 1981 due to a lack of funds for upkeep. It was demolished by a local property developer for a large housing development on the site.

The York Corporation bought Fairfield House on the opposite side of the main road in 1918 and opened it as a tuberculosis sanatorium in the following year. It is now a hotel. (A tuberculosis dispensary was also opened in Castlegate in the City of York, in 1913, but no longer exists.)

== Governance ==
Skelton is part of the Unitary Authority of the City of York Council. It is part of the ward of Rawcliffe and Clifton Without.

Skelton Parish Council is elected by the residents of the parish to administer local matters and consists of nine councillors.

Skelton is within the UK Parliamentary Constituency of York Outer.

== Demography ==
In 1890 its population was recorded as 313. By 1901 the village was recorded as comprising 2473 acres with a population of 270 having varied over the previous hundred years between 203 and 367; most were employed in servicing the large houses and in agriculture. In 1951 the population was still only about 481 but then expanded rapidly. In 2001 the population stood at 1,640.

== Economy ==
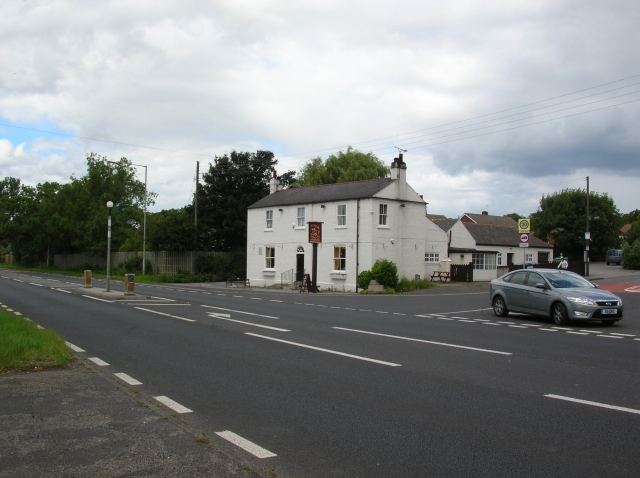
The Blacksmiths Arms

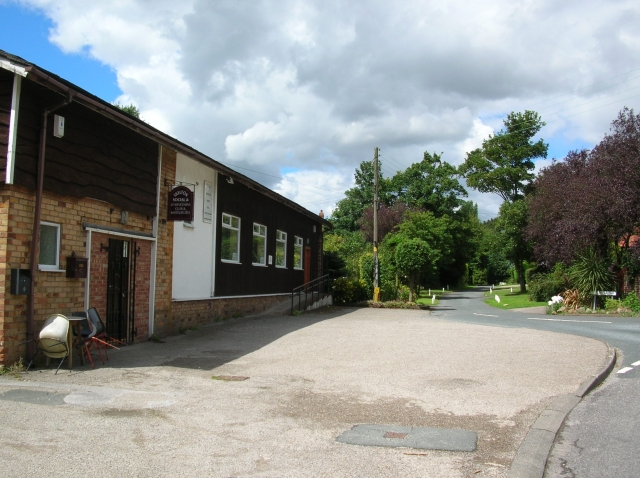
Skelton Social Club

The village was primarily agricultural in nature, but is now mostly residential with a small commercial district to the south west of the village. Local Services consist of a post office and general store, one public house and one social club, and a doctor's surgery.

== Geography ==
The old village centre stands on a deposit of boulder clay, taking this part to a height some 25 metres above sea level, 10 metres more than the remainder of the village which is on strong clay, resting on gravel and sand. Within the settlement are several ponds, indicating a high water-table.

The flora and fauna was documented in two surveys, one in 1956 and then in 1971. In and around the village the surveys identified 100 species of bird, 328 species of trees and plants, 8 different ferns, 31 different types of moss, 9 fungi and amphibians including frogs, toads, the warty or crested newt and the smooth newt. Also recorded were 21 species of mammals including the whiskered bat and the long-eared bat. The bats and the crested newts in the village are protected species.

In the village open spaces have been cared for by the Parish Council and local volunteer groups and include The Green, Crooking Green, Orchard Field, The Pasture, Skelton Pond, the open spaces at Sycamore Close and Brecksfield.

The long, narrow plot boundaries extending back from the older houses are an example of the typical medieval pattern of 'toft and croft' agriculture.

== Transport ==
The main road which runs to the west of the village (from York towards Thirsk) was a turnpike and then in the last century became a major trunk route the A19.

There were attempts to turnpike the York-Northallerton road that passed through Skelton in 1749, but these failed. The scheme was revived in 1752 when the York Corporation sought that no gate should be nearer to York than the north end of Skelton, and that the section of the road nearer York should be repaired first. The Turnpike Trust was established in 1753. The trust was renewed in 1778, 1794, 1808, 1830, and by the Continuance Acts until 1874.

The village is served by four bus services as part of the York to Easingwold (29, 30, 30X and 31X), two further services as part of the York to Thirsk route (30 and 30X), and one local service to York (Service 19 which enters the village itself, but terminates here; it runs to Rawcliffe and parts of Clifton and thence to the City Centre, and is a council-supported service due to low demand).

== Education ==
A school was built in 1872. It accommodated 120 children, and had an average attendance of about half that number. Now primary education is catered for at Skelton Community Primary School located in Brecksfield. The village is within the Local Education Authority catchment area for Vale of York Academy on Rawcliffe Drive in nearby Clifton Without.

== Religion ==
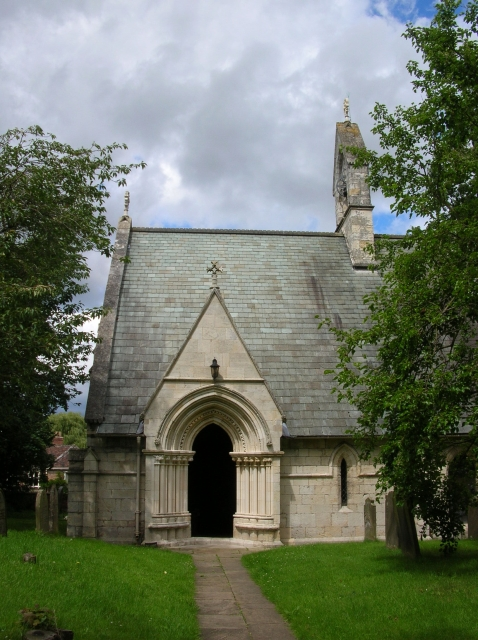
St Giles church

The Church of St Giles, formerly known as All Saints, dates from 1247. Despite two restoration schemes, the church has stood "virtually unaltered" since it was built, and is claimed to be "now one of only two complete Early English churches in the country." It is mentioned by Nikolaus Pevsner in his 1966 The Buildings of England: Yorkshire North Riding, by John Betjeman in his 1958 English Parish Churches and by Simon Jenkins in his 1999 England's Thousand Best Churches.

== Sports ==
Skelton Football Club played in the York Sunday Morning League Division until 2010.

== Notable landmarks and residents ==
St Giles' Church is a Grade I listed building, dating from 1247, Skelton Manor is Grade II* listed, and Grade II listed buildings include Pyramid House, and Skelton Hall. The old Toll Bar Cottage was built when the road north was turnpiked. There is also a George VI post-box in the wall of the old post office, and a mounting block outside the Blacksmiths Arms.

The Blessed John Nelson, whose Feast day is 3 February, was a Jesuit martyr born in Skelton. He was ordained at Douai at the age of forty and sent to London in 1576 where he was arrested and martyred at Tyburn by being hanged, drawn and quartered. John became a Jesuit just before his death.

Notable residents include author Justin Hill, whose family home was here from 1985 to 2004.
