= John Nelson (martyr) =

English Jesuit martyr

Blessed John Nelson SJ

Martyr
- Born: c. 1535; Skelton, York, England
- Died: 3 February 1578 (aged 52 - 53); Tyburn, London, England
- Venerated in: Catholic Church
- Beatified: 29 December 1886 by Pope Leo XIII
- Feast: 3 February
- Attributes: noose in neck, book of hours, martyr's palm

John Nelson (1535 – 3 February 1578) was an English Jesuit martyr who was executed during the reign of Elizabeth I.

Nelson was from Skelton, York. He was nearing 40 when he left for Douai in 1573 for training as a priest. Two of his four brothers would later follow him there to become priests. He was ordained at Binche in the County of Hainaut by Monsignor Louis de Berlaymont, Archbishop of Cambrai, on 11 June 1576. The date and place of his admission to the Society of Jesus are unknown. The following November, he left for his mission, which appears to have been in London.

He was arrested on 1 December 1577 at his residence, "late in the evening as he was saying the Nocturne of the Matins for the next day following", and was put into Newgate Prison as a suspected Papist. He had written to the French Jesuits during his imprisonment for permission to be admitted to the Society.

When interrogated about a week later, he refused to take the oath recognizing the Queen's supremacy in spiritual matters, and was induced by the commissioners to declare the Queen a schismatic. Under the Legislation of 1571, this was high treason and was punishable by death. He was condemned to death on 1 February 1578, and was confined after the trial in an underground dungeon in the Tower of London, the Pit of the Tower. While in prison he subsisted on bread and water and was able to say Mass.

On his execution day he refused to see several Protestant ministers, after meeting with family members. He was taken to Tyburn and was allowed to speak before the bystanders, who were mostly hostile in the historically Protestant London. When asked to beg pardon of the Queen, he responded, "I will ask no pardon of her, for I have never offended her." He then asked any Catholics in the crowd to pray with him as he recited several common prayers in Latin. He was hanged and cut down alive, then quartered. His last words were, reportedly, "I forgive the queen and all the authors of my death".

He was beatified on 29 December 1886 by Pope Leo XIII.

== See also ==
- Catholic Church in the United Kingdom
- Douai Martyrs

== Sources ==
- The most reliable compact source is Godfrey Anstruther, Seminary Priests, St Edmund's College, Ware, vol. 1, 1968, pp. 245–247.
