= King Richard III Visitor Centre =

Museum in Leicester, England

Coordinates: 52.6342°N 1.1362°W

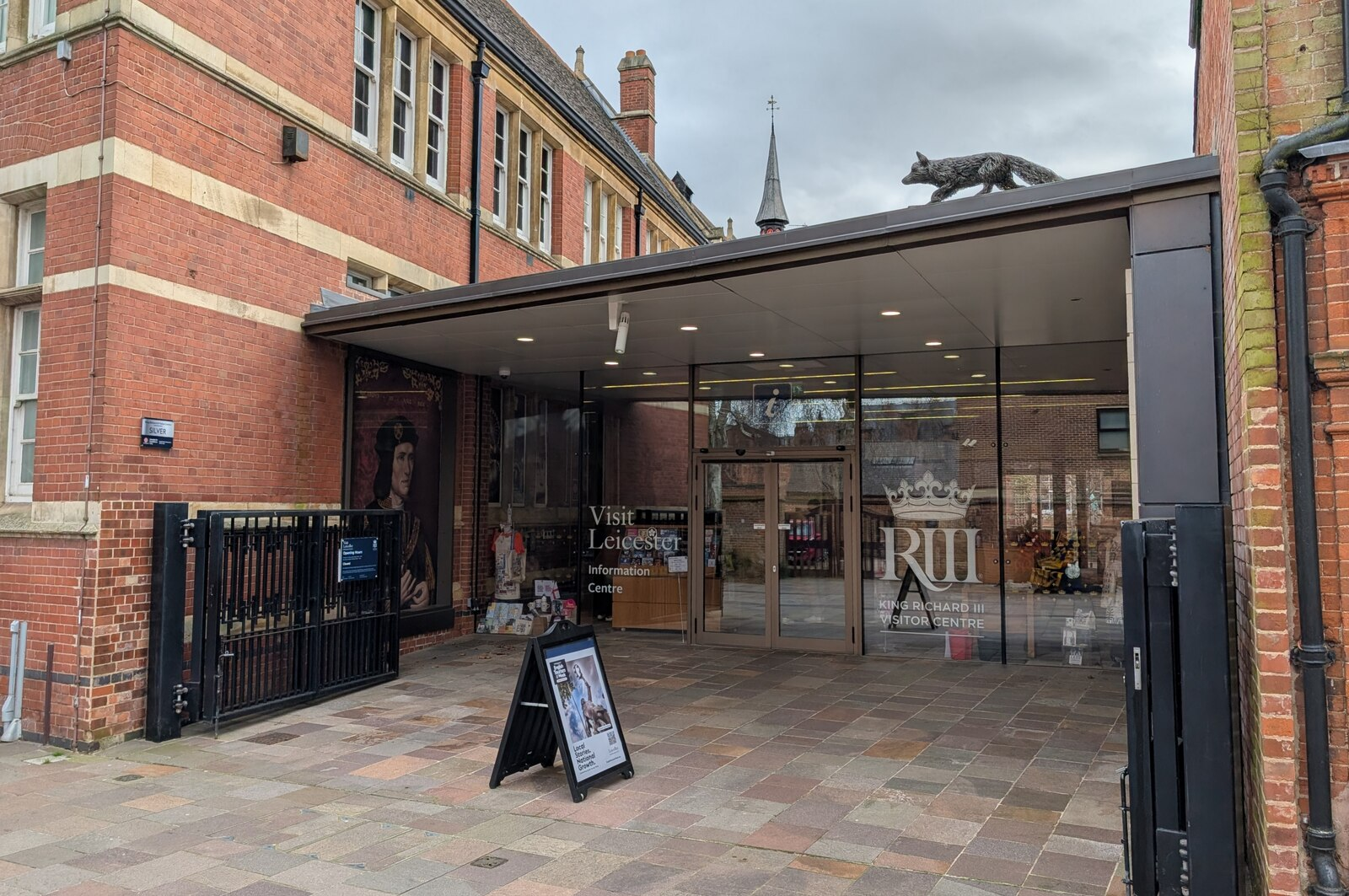
- The entrance
- Established: Greyfriars: c. 1230; 796 years ago; King Richard III Visitor Centre: 26 July 2014; 11 years ago
- Location: 4A Saint Martins, Leicester, LE1 5DB, England, United Kingdom
- Visitors: 300,000+ (since 2014)
- Website: kriii.com

Key historic sites of Leicester Old Town. The Roman and medieval walls are marked by the dotted line. The visitor centre stands on the site of Greyfriars and is marked in green and bold letters. The one surviving Roman ruin is marked in purple. The secular sites are in blue. The towns five surviving ancient churches are in red. The dissolved mendicant and chantry foundations are in black. The key site of Leicester Abbey over the river is beyond the borders of the map to the north east.

King Richard III Visitor Centre is a museum in Leicester, England that showcases the life of King Richard III of England and the story of the discovery, exhumation, and reburial of his remains in 2012–2015.

For a long time, the burial place of Richard III was uncertain, although the site of his burial was assumed to be in a Leicester car park. DNA evidence enabled the identification of his remains.

The centre opened on 26 July 2014 on the site of the then recently excavated Greyfriars, the medieval friary where the King was buried in 1485 following his death at the Battle of Bosworth Field.

== Location ==
The Centre occupies a former school, Alderman Newton's School, next to the original Social Services car park where King Richard's remains were found during Philippa Langley and the Richard III Society's excavation project, which was started by the University of Leicester Archaeological Services (ULAS) on 25 August 2012 (the remains were found on the first day).

Because of worldwide interest in the discovery, Leicester City Council converted the Victorian school building into a visitor centre. The project includes a covered area over the original grave site, which was in the choir of the friary, alongside a section of the choir floor of the church. The centre cost £4 million, and was designed by Paul East of Maber Architects.

== Access and conservation ==
The burial site is part of a scheduled monument. In December 2017, Historic England scheduled a significant part of the site of the former friary. While the associated buildings had long been demolished, the site was assessed as having archaeological potential.

== Awards ==
In October 2018, the Visitor Centre was awarded "Best Museum" in the Group Leisure and Travel Awards, after being nominated in the same category as the British Museum and the National Railway Museum.

== Gallery ==
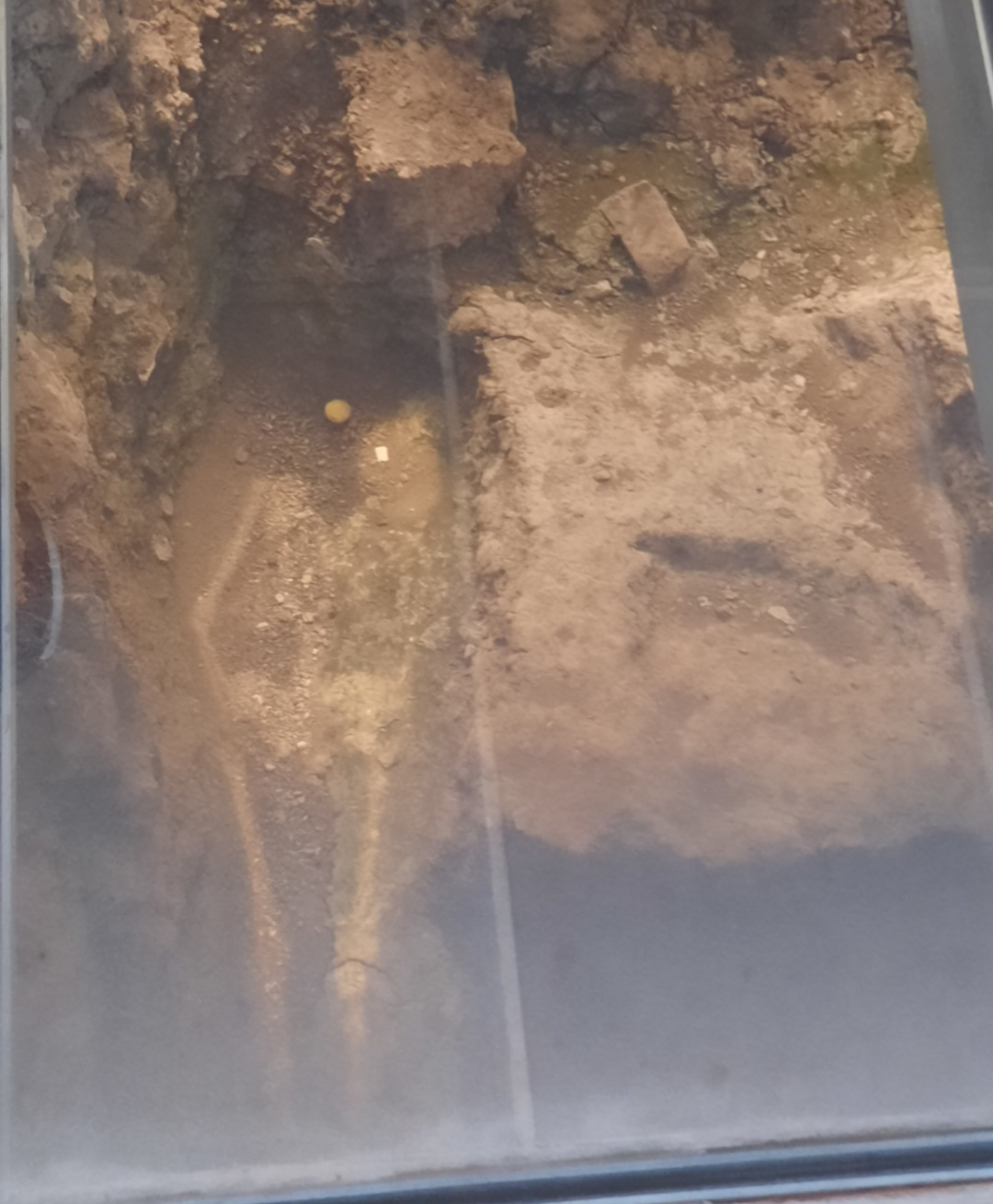
The original grave of Richard III, under the then choir of Greyfriars, Leicester. A projector light outlines the skeleton in its original position.

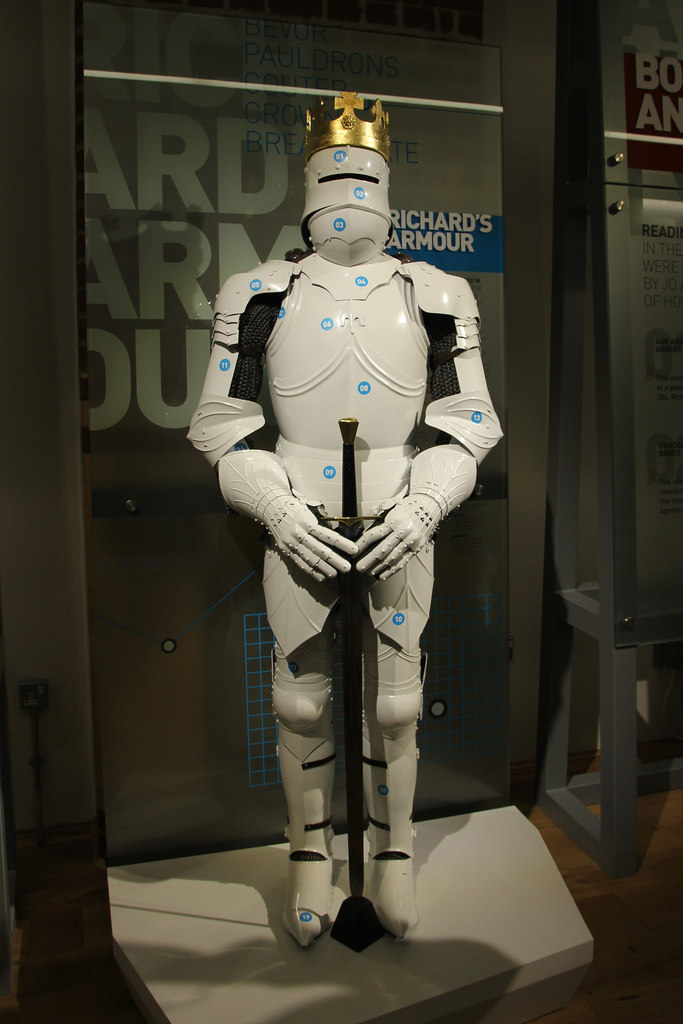
Replica of Richard III's armour

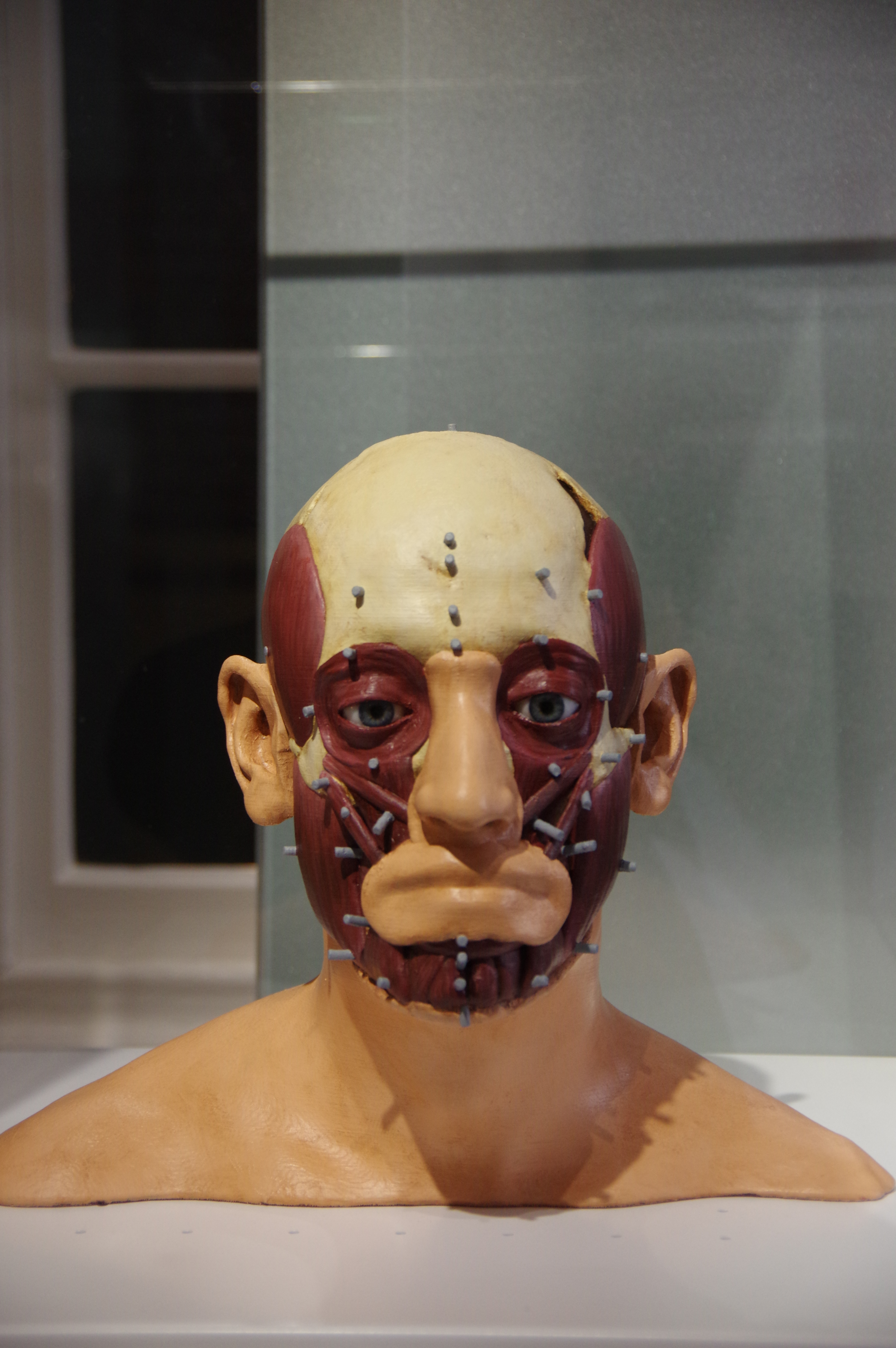
The "muscle stage" of the reconstruction of the face of Richard III

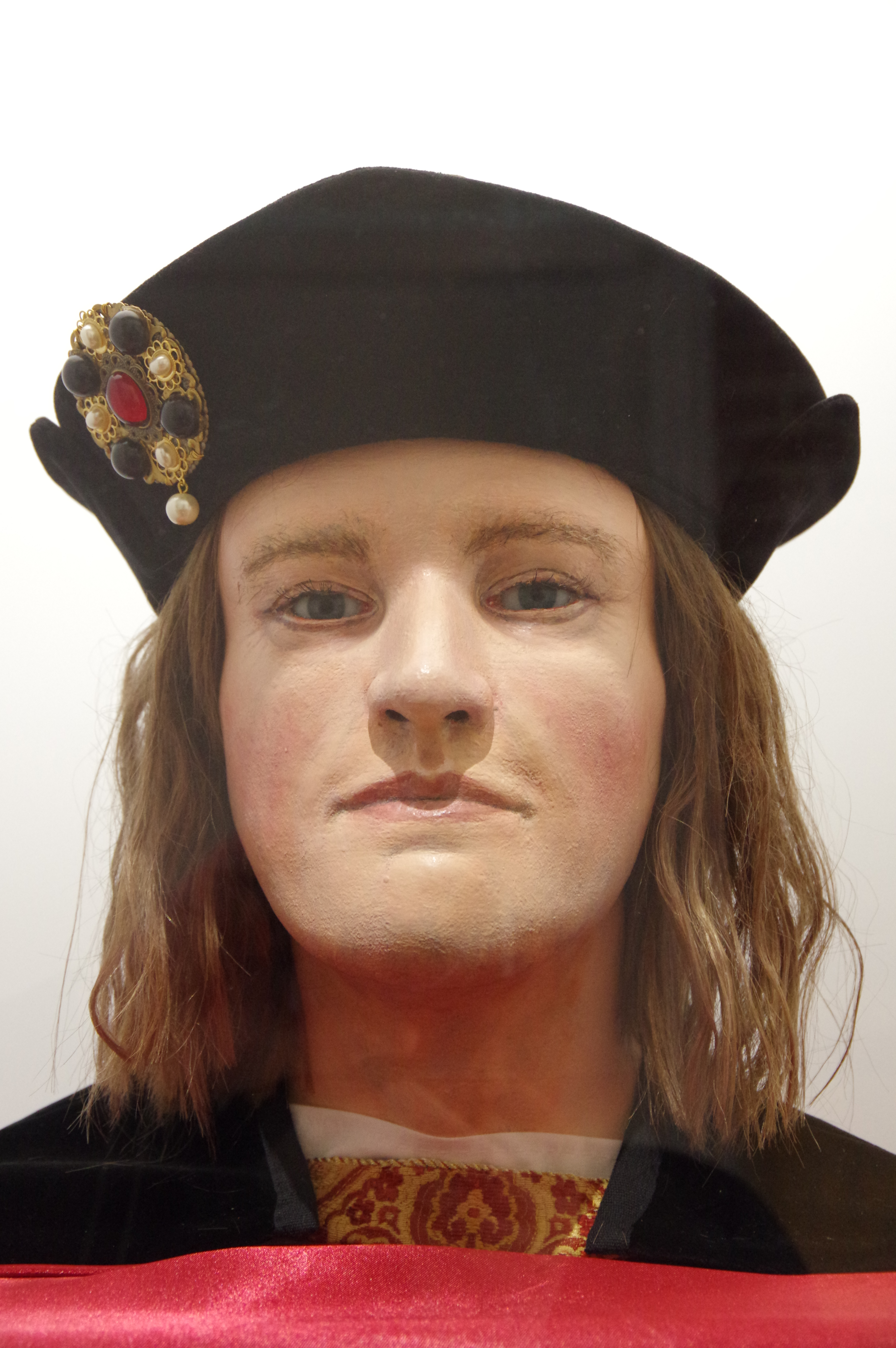
Richard III's reconstructed face

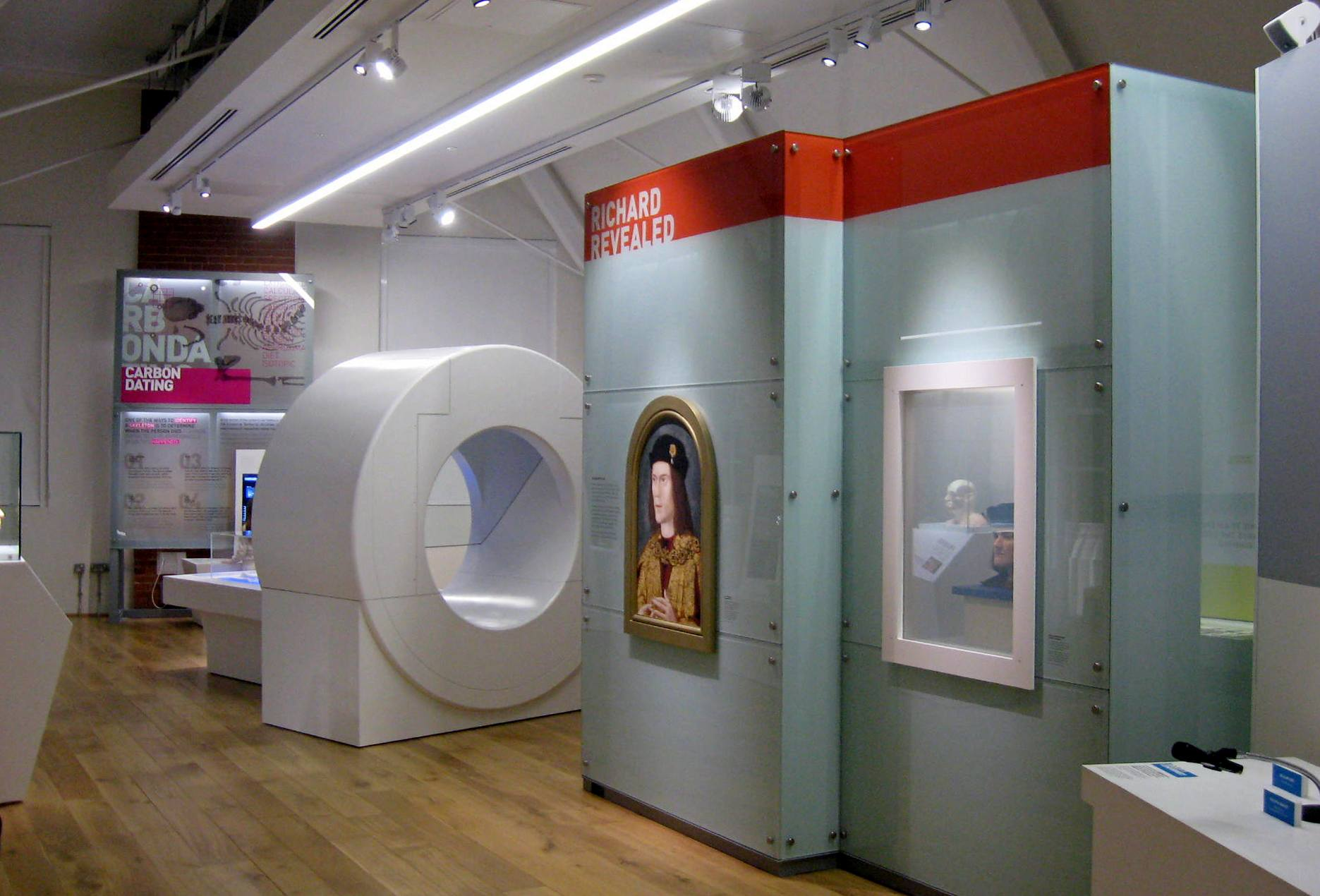
The upstairs gallery of the museum

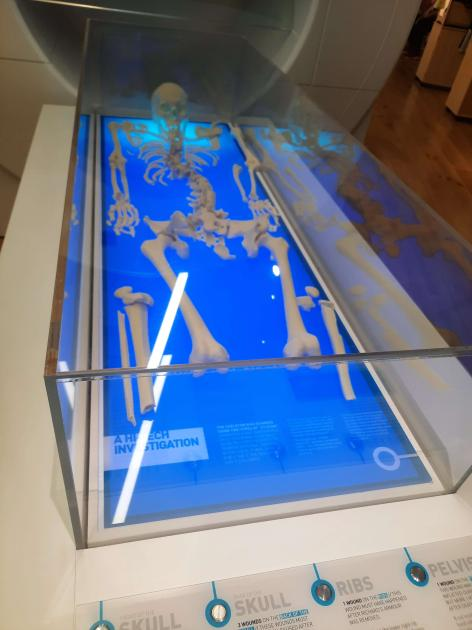
The replica of Richard III's skeleton

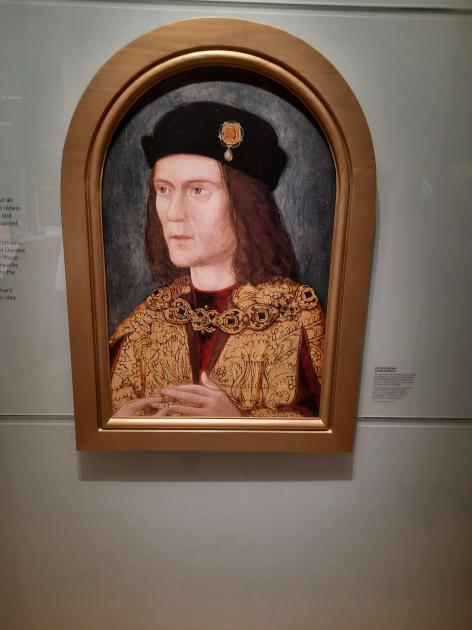
A replica of the oldest surviving portrait of Richard III, with the original dating to around 1520

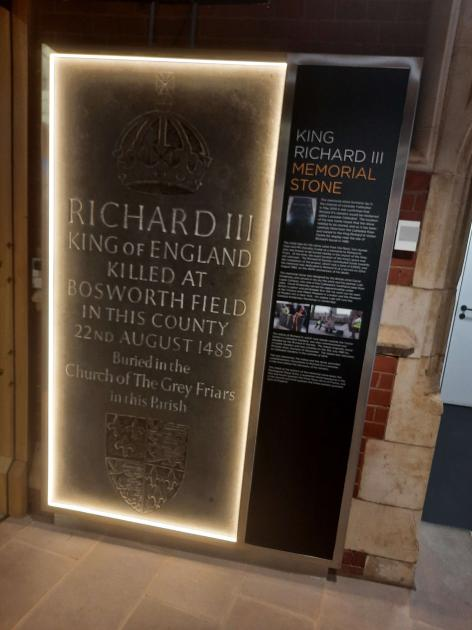
A ledger stone (memorial stone) dedicated to Richard III, originally from Leicester Cathedral

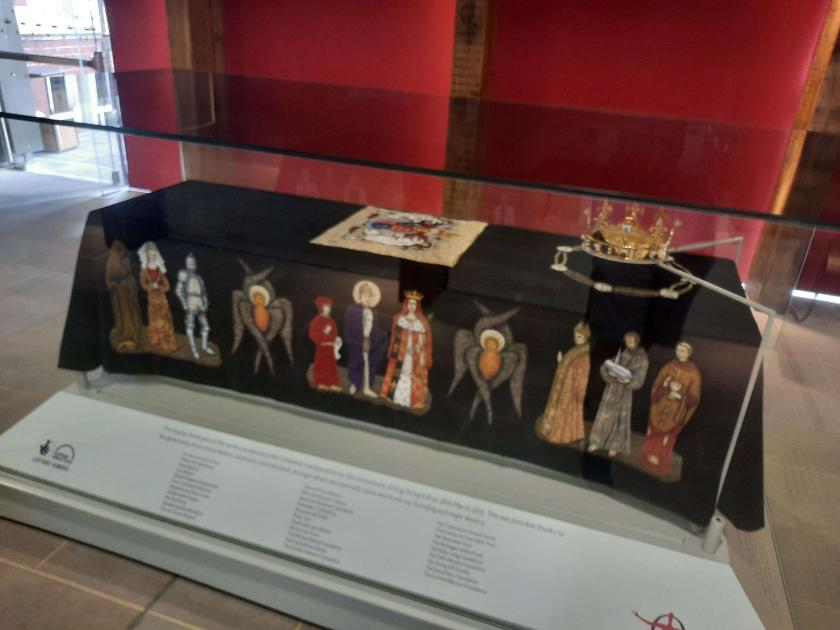
The pall that covered the coffin of Richard III when he was re-buried in 2015

== See also ==
- Exhumation and reburial of Richard III of England
- Greyfriars, Leicester
- Philippa Langley
- Richard III Experience at Monk Bar – Museum in the City of York, North Yorkshire, England
