= Skelton Manor =

Listed house in York, England

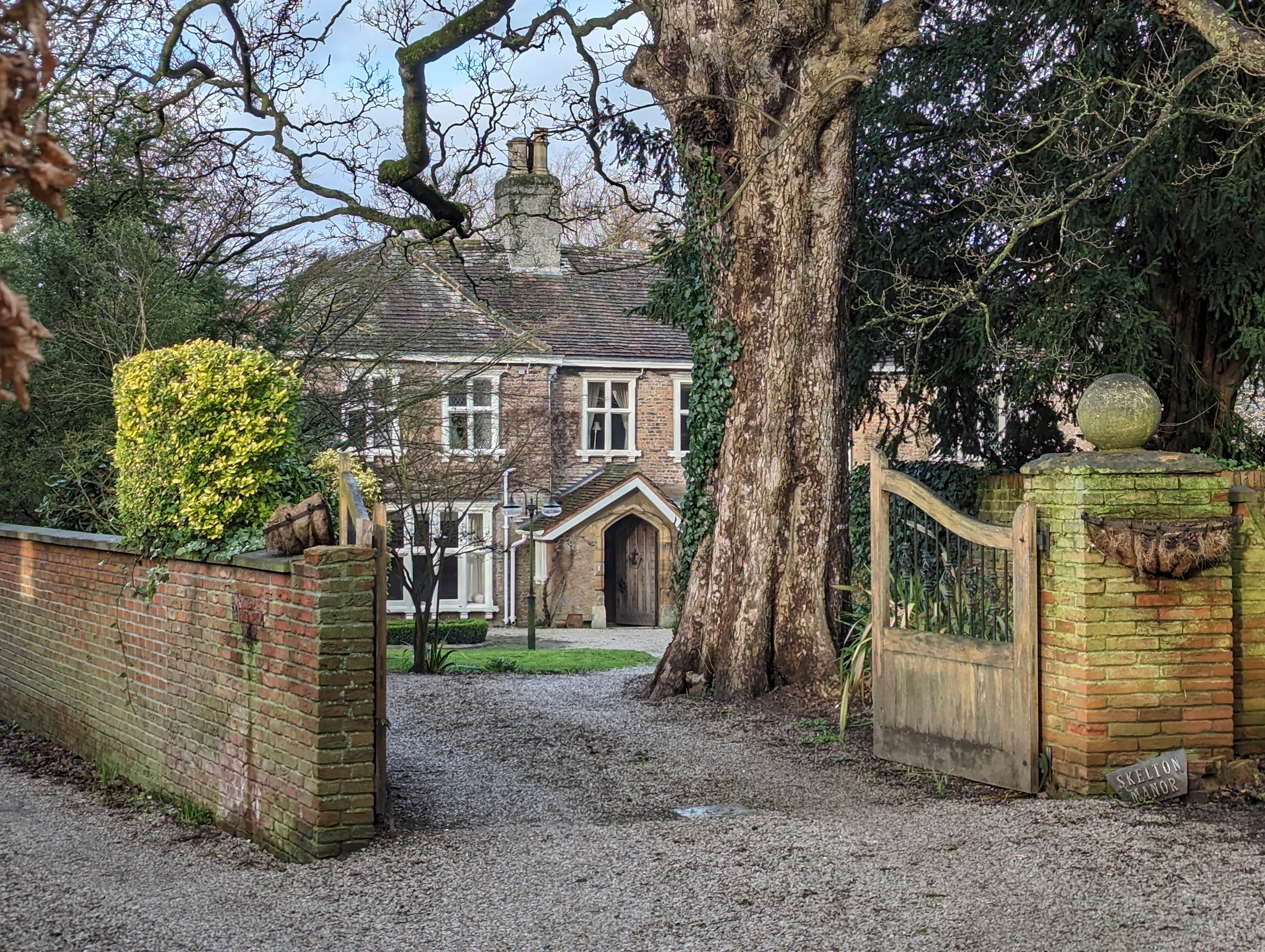
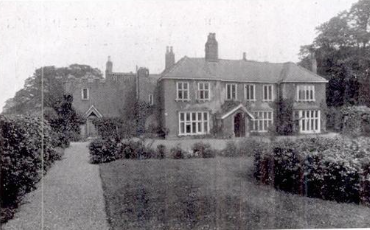
- The house in 2023 The house in 1938

General information
- Address: Skelton, York, England
- Coordinates: 54°00′07″N 1°07′59″W
- Year(s) built: Mid-16th century
- Renovated: Mid-18th and late 19th centuries (altered)

Technical details
- Floor count: 2
- Designations

Listed Building – Grade II*
- Official name: Skelton Manor
- Designated: 29 January 1953
- Reference no.: 1149145

Skelton Manor is a historic house in the village of Skelton, in the rural northern part of the City of York, in England.

The house lies north of St Giles' Church. It was built in the mid-16th century for Edward Besley and Bridget Nelson. Historic England describes it as probably originally being a hall, with two wings at the rear. However, it has been so altered, in the mid-18th century and again in the late 19th century, that this is not certain. It was originally timber-framed, although over time, much of the timber has been replaced by brick.

The building is two storeys tall, and is now entered through a hallway; two wings now project slightly forward of the main body of the house. Most of its windows have mullions and transoms and date from the late 19th century, as does the porch and front door.

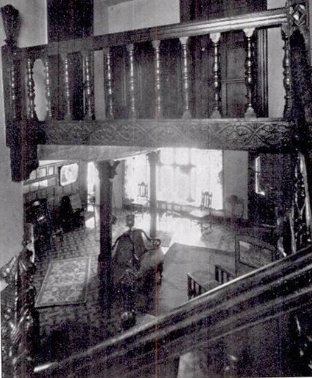
Interior of the house, in 1938

The Victoria County History states that the house's "chief interest lies in the internal fittings". These include some original wooden posts. The entrance hall has 17th-century oak panelling, as do the dining and sitting rooms. The dining room fireplace is probably 16th-century, albeit much altered by the Victorians, and the room is also noted for carved frieze. The staircase is Elizabethan, perhaps made by Thomas Ventris. Upstairs, the chamber over the hall has 17th-century panelling and its main beam has a frieze of pomegranates, which is probably mid-16th-century, while the door from it to the landing is 16th-century, with 15th-century bosses attached. The upstairs sitting room has a late 16th-century frieze depicting mermaids and mermen, while the west bedroom has 17th-century panelling, and the east bedroom is also panelled.

In 1923, the house was described as "much overgrown with creepers". In 1953, the house was Grade II* listed.

== See also ==
- Grade II* listed buildings in the City of York
