= Skelton Hall =

Grade II listed house in North Yorkshire, England

Coordinates: 54.00248°N 1.13330°W

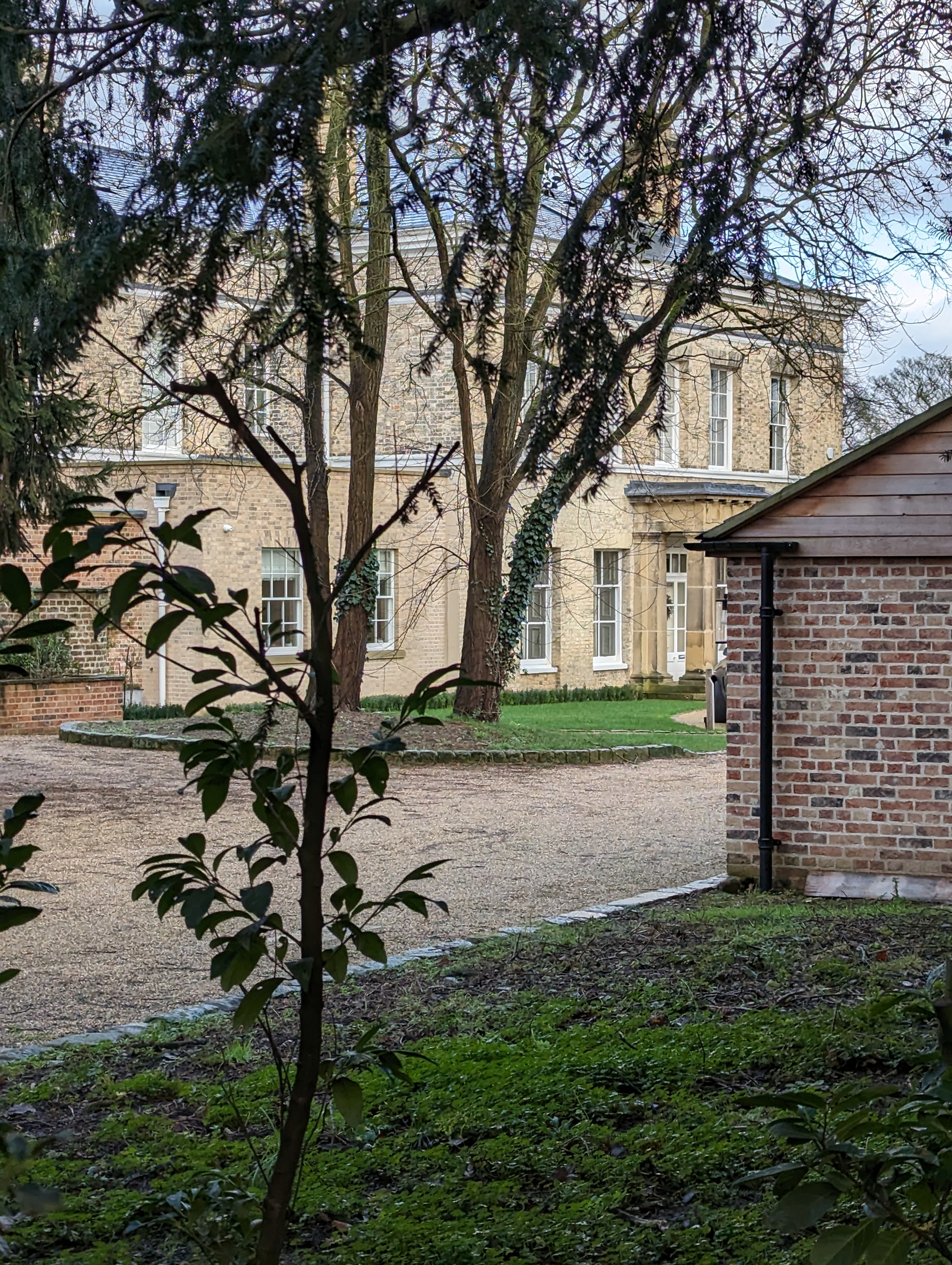
The house, in 2023

Skelton Hall is a Grade II listed building located in North Yorkshire, England. In 1814 Mrs Mary Thompson, the widow of Henry Thompson, came to live in Skelton at The Cottage from where she not only kept an eye on the repairs that she financed at the church, but also on the building of Skelton Lodge (later Hall) which is shown in an 1839 lithograph. The Lodge became The Hall in about 1867, and the Thompsons were succeeded as owners by the Thornton Duesberys.

== Gardens ==
It is believed that the gardens were laid out at the time the house was constructed, and were designed by John Meikle, a student of Capability Brown. Certainly the hand of a master is in evidence, with magnificent plantings complementing sweeping lawns and a lake, now stocked with, among other specimens, carp and tench.

== Second World War and after ==
The Hall later had a chequered history. During the Second World War it was requisitioned by the RAF, and after the war it was regarded as too large for contemporary living and was divided into two separate properties. In 1997 the individual owners of both wings decided independently to market their houses and as a result a single owner was found for The Hall, namely the Cooke family who undertook a refurbishment to reunite both wings of the property back into one property.
