= City Walls Experience at Micklegate Bar =

Museum in York, England

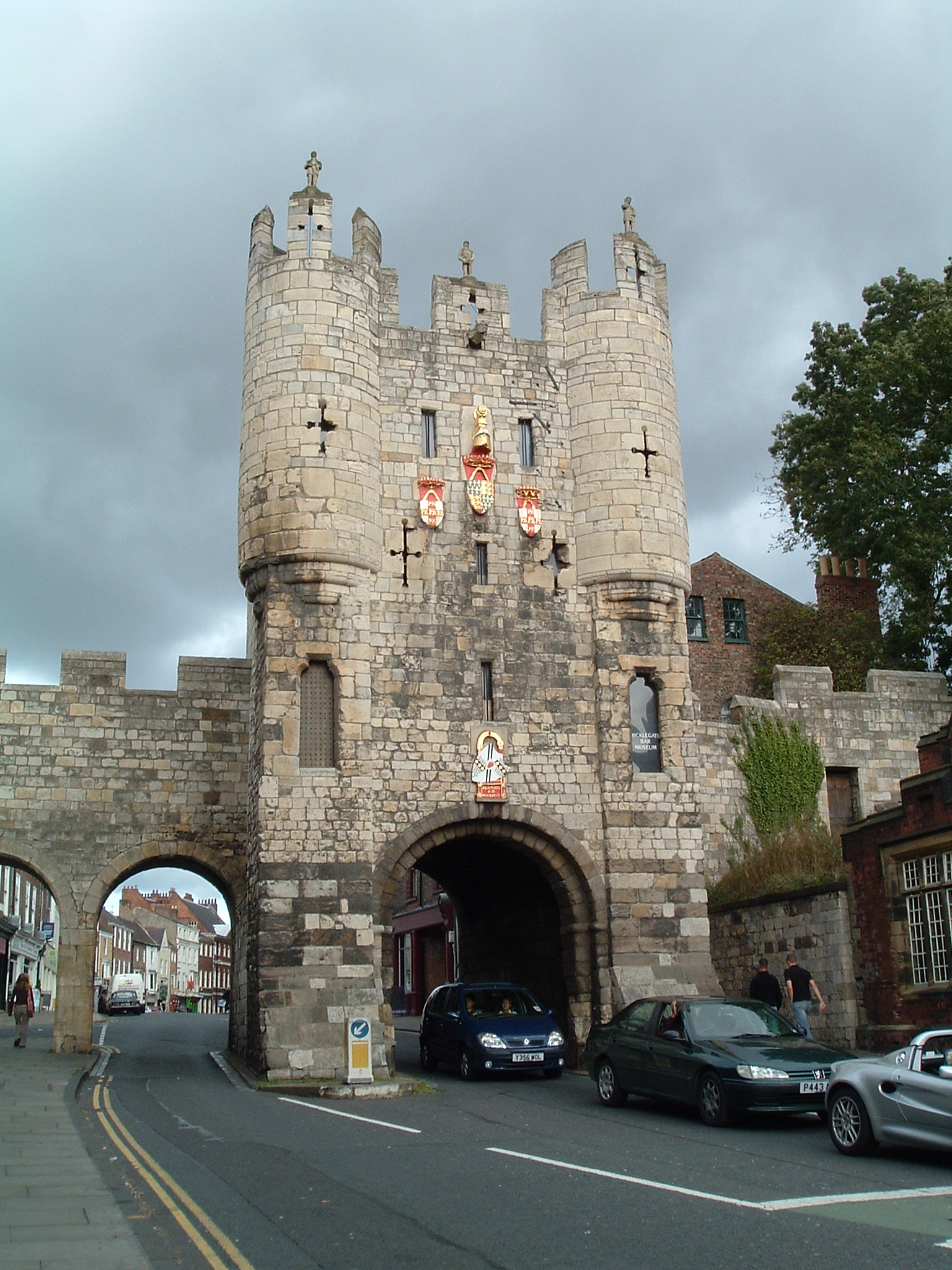
- Micklegate Bar, York
- Former names: Micklegate Bar Museum; Henry VII Experience at Micklegate Bar
- Location: Micklegate Bar, York, England
- Coordinates: 53.9559°N 1.09079°W
- Type: Local history museum
- Owner: Jorvik Group (YAT)
- Public transit access: York Station 0.2 miles (0.32 km)
- Parking: Nunnery Lane Car Park
- Website: City Walls Experience

location within York

The City Walls Experience at Micklegate Bar was located in the southern gatehouse of the historical city walls of York, England. It was operated by the Jorvik Group (part of York Archaeological Trust) and used maps, display screens and video presentations to tell the story of the fortifications surrounding the city. It closed in 2024.

== History ==
Before 2014 the Micklegate Bar Museum had covered a wide historical range, telling the story of York from Roman times through to the 20th century. Exhibits included replicas of the heads of historical figures, such as Richard of York and Sir Henry Percy whose heads had been displayed on Micklegate Bar.

When the Jorvik Group took over the Richard III Museum in February 2014 the names of both museums were changed and the contents replaced and updated, to create two complementary museums: the Richard III Experience at Monk Bar and the Henry VII Experience at Micklegate Bar. Both reopened in April 2014 using the tagline "Two Kings, Two Bars, One City". The museum at Micklegate Bar explored the early life of Henry VII as a Lancastrian in exile, his reign as king after the Wars of the Roses and the impact of the establishment of the Tudor royal dynasty on the city of York. It did this through a combination of interactive exhibits, multimedia presentations, displays of items such as suits of armour and 'grisly facts' from Terry Deary (writer of Horrible Histories).

In October 2014 and February 2018 the Henry VII Experience was awarded the 'Hidden Gem' accolade by Visit England. In 2015 it was a finalist (with the Richard III Experience) in the Visit York Tourism Awards in the Visitor Attraction of the Year (Under 50,000 Visitors) category.

York Archaeological Trust closed the museum, along with its other visitor attractions, in 2020 at the onset of the COVID-19 pandemic. When its larger sites reopened in July 2020, both the Richard III and Henry VII experiences remained closed owing to their limited capacity for social distancing. The Henry VII Experience was replaced by the City Walls Experience which opened in April 2022. This was closed in 2024 and in September 2025 plans were submitted for Micklegate Bar to be used as an art gallery and shop.
