= St Giles' Church, Skelton =

Grade I listed church in York, England

Coordinates: 54.002°N 1.134°W

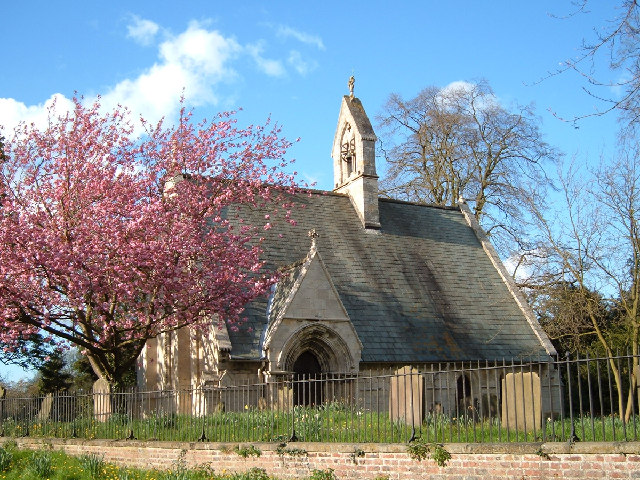
The church, in 2005

St Giles' Church is the parish church of Skelton, a village in the rural northern part of the City of York.

The church lies at the northern end of the village green. Records show that it was completed in or just before 1247, and the entire church is in the style of that period. The Victoria County History of the North Riding of Yorkshire states that "as an example of early 13th century work it is unequalled by any other parish church in the county".

Local tradition maintains that the church was built with the stones that remained after the building of the south transept of York Minster, in 1227. Historic England states that the church was probably constructed by the same masons as that transept. The church is thus sometimes called "Little St Peter's". The following extract from Archbishop Grey's roll shows that its building took place previous to the year 1247:

"Confirmation of a donation to the chapel of Skelton. To all, etc. The donation which our beloved son in Christ, Master E. Hagitur, treasurer of York, made to John de l'Edes, clerk of the chapel of Skelton, considering it to be agreeable and satisfactory to us, we confirm the same by our Pontifical authority, desiring the said treasurer, and his successors, to pay annually the sum of 20d. to this parson. In witness whereof, &c., &c. Dated at Thorp, on the 6th day of the Ides of December, A.D. 1247."

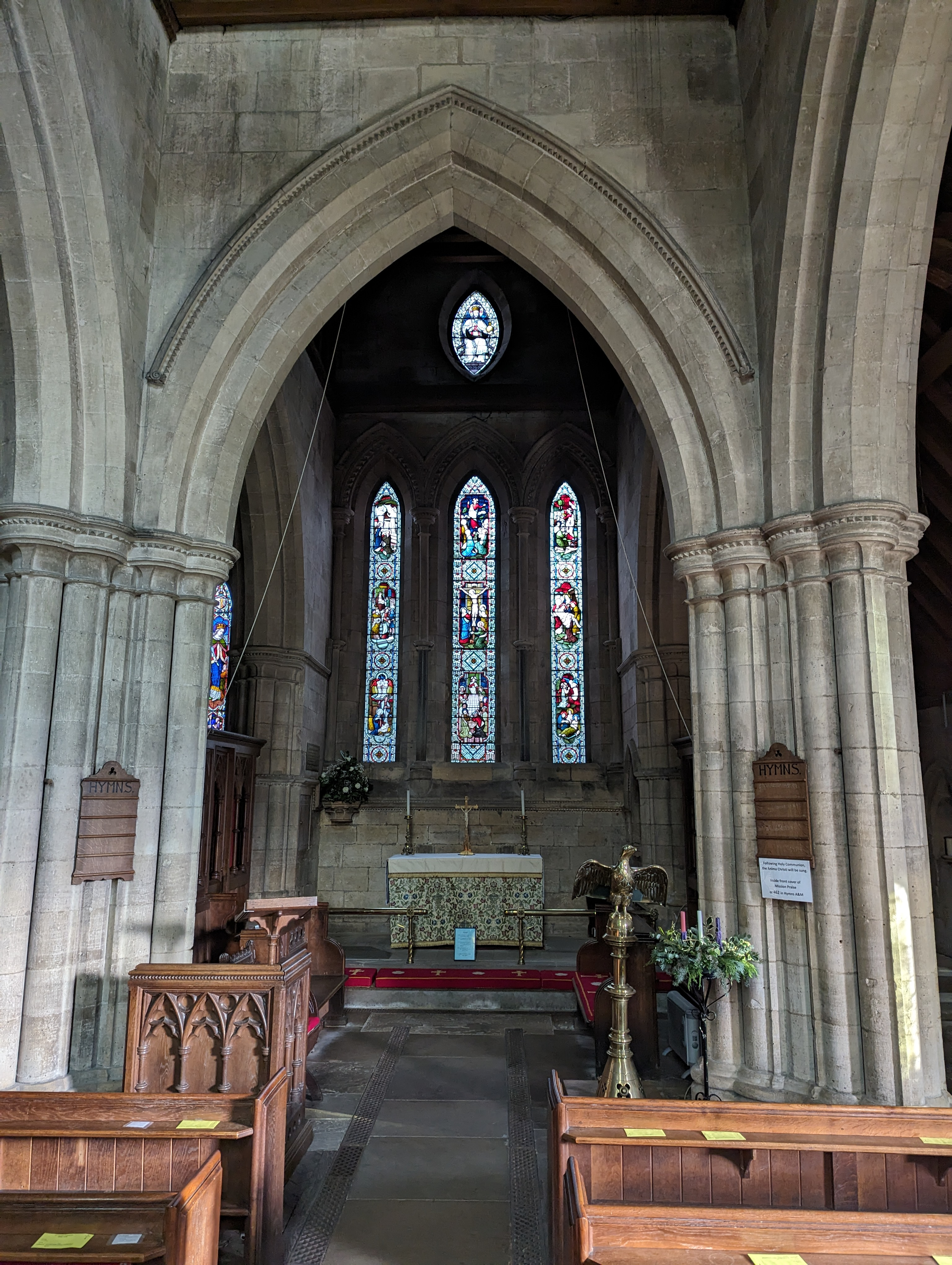
View from the nave into the chancel, in 2023

The church formerly had a small steeple at its west end, which housed two bells, but this was removed in the 18th century. The church was restored between 1810 and 1818 by Henry Graham, who heavily restored the porch as an exact replica of the original design. The church was and again restored in 1863 by Ewan Christian. Despite two restoration schemes, the church has stood "virtually unaltered" since it was built, and is claimed to be "now one of only two complete Early English churches in the country." It is mentioned by Nikolaus Pevsner in his 1966 The Buildings of England: Yorkshire North Riding, by John Betjeman in his 1958 English Parish Churches and by Simon Jenkins in his 1999 England's Thousand Best Churches. Long dedicated to All Saints, it is now dedicated to Saint Giles. In 1986, it was grade I listed.

The church is small, measuring 44 feet (13 m) by 32.5 feet (9.9 m). The nave is two bays long, and the chancel a single bay, separated by a chancel arch. There are north and south aisles running the full length of the church. The east window is of three lancets, with a deeply carved surround, while the main west window is a single large lancet. In both aisles are an aumbry and piscina and original windows; the west window of the north aisle has some ancient stained glass. The whole building is covered by a single, pitched, roof.

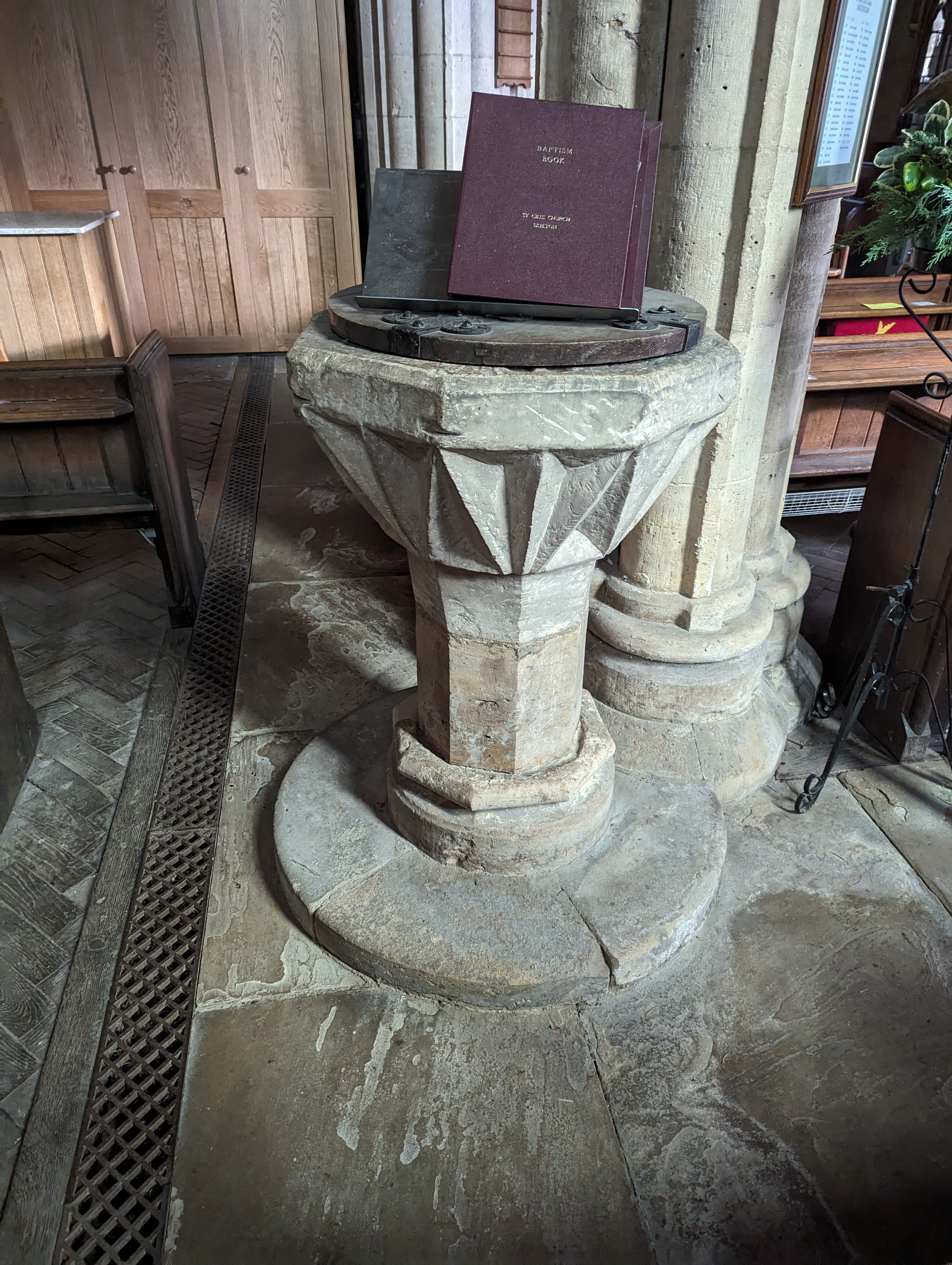
The font

The font is of similar date to the church. There is a worn tablet in the south aisle commemorating Robert and Anne Lovell, who both died in 1421. Other memorials are to Tomlinson Bunting, who died in 1768, and to Joseph and Sarah Hotham, erected in 1791. The register starts in 1538.
