= York Archaeological Trust =

British archaeological company

York Archaeological Trust for Excavation and Research Limited
- Trade name: York Archaeology
- Company type: Charity
- Industry: Commercial archaeology, Heritage, Tourism
- Founded: 1972
- Headquarters: York, United Kingdom
- Website: www.yorkarchaeology.co.uk

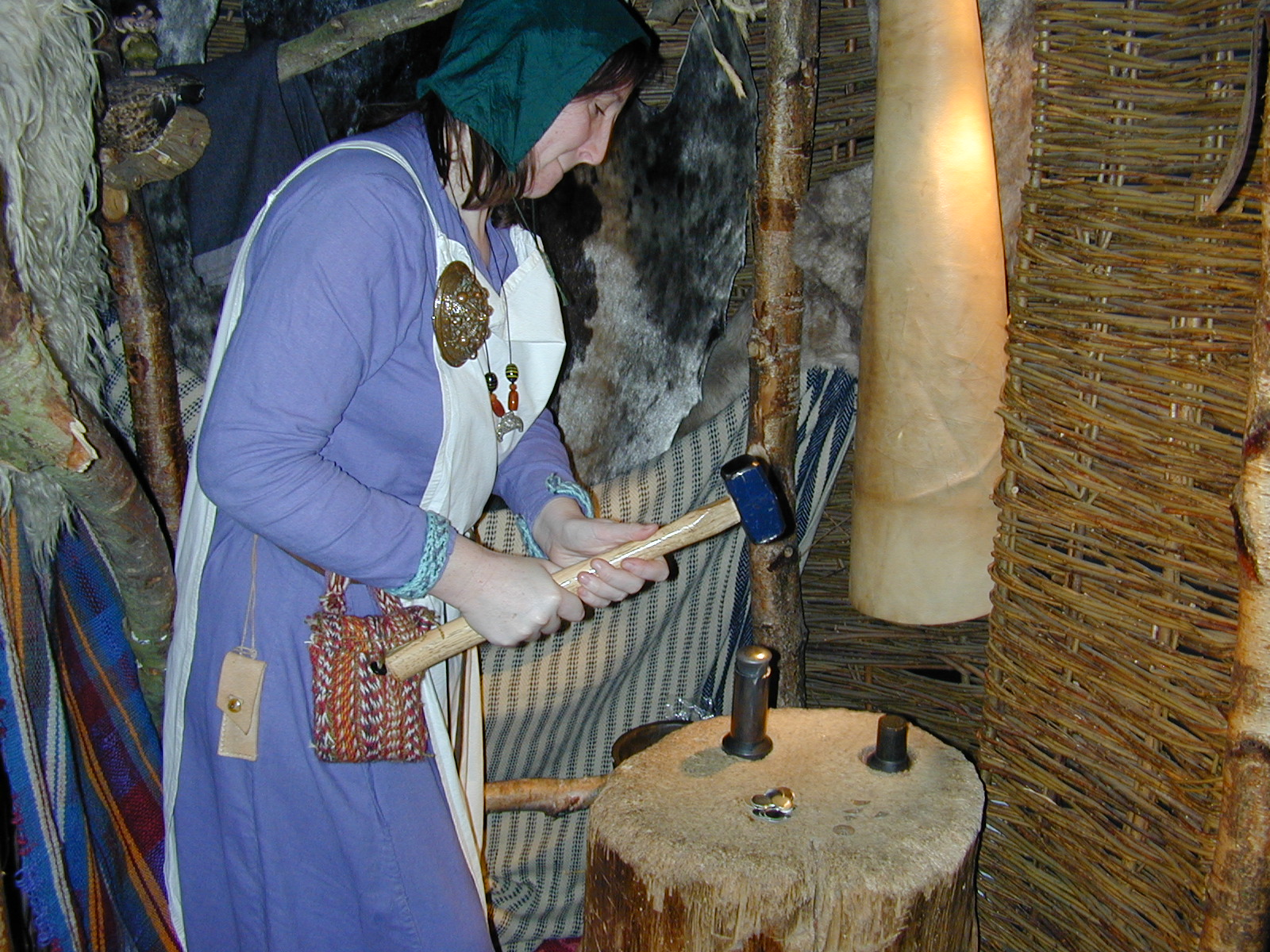
Modern-day Viking coin-making at the Jorvik Viking Centre

YAT/Jorvik Group locations in York

The York Archaeological Trust for Excavation and Research Limited (YAT) is an educational charity, established in 1972 in the city of York, England, and trading under the York Archaeology brand since 2023. The charity presents archaeology to the public through visitor attractions and events, and its commercial arm carries out archaeological investigations, fieldwork, excavation and research in York and throughout Britain and beyond.

== History ==
YAT was established in 1972, became a registered charity in 1979, and incorporated as a company limited by guarantee in the same year. Peter Addyman, an archaeologist and later a professor at the universities of Bradford and York, was instrumental in its creation and was the body's first director, holding that position until his retirement in 2002. Addyman led excavations in York's Coppergate area between 1976 and 1981, and in 1984 the trust opened the Jorvik Viking Centre on the site, in order to share the discoveries with the public and educate visitors on the significance of the Vikings in York and the British Isles.

Patrick Ottaway was head of fieldwork at YAT for a time until 2006.

Since October 2023, York Archaeology has been the trading name of all YAT's activities.

== Commercial operations ==
YAT primarily provides archaeological services to fulfil planning conditions, serving clients from private individuals to local authorities and commercial developers, as a company operating within the commercial archaeology sector.

In 2011, Trent and Peak Archaeology was taken over by YAT, allowing extension of their commercial archaeology operations to Nottingham. YAT also operated ArcHeritage, providing archaeological services in Sheffield, and Northlight Heritage in Glasgow, a social enterprise promoting better use of heritage resources. In November 2021, the three archaeological services – York, Trent & Peak and ArcHeritage – were brought together under the York Archaeology brand.

== Visitor attractions ==
The Trust created and runs the Jorvik Viking Centre in Coppergate Walk, York, which is noted for its living history approach. The centre is on the site of the Trust's 'Viking Dig' which contributed to archaeologists' knowledge of town life in Viking Age England. Other sites in York run by the Jorvik Group are:

- Barley Hall, an excavated and reconstructed medieval house in Coffee Yard, off Stonegate
- DIG: An Archaeological Adventure in St Saviour's Church, St Saviourgate
- City Walls Experience at Micklegate Bar

From 2014, the Trust operated two small museums in gatehouses of York's city walls: the Richard III Experience at Monk Bar and the Henry VII Experience at Micklegate Bar. Both closed in 2020 at the onset of the COVID-19 pandemic, owing to their limited capacity for social distancing. In April 2022, the Henry VII Experience was replaced by the City Walls Experience.

Since the 1980s, the Jorvik Viking Festival has been run by YAT each February half term.

== Other operations ==
The trust publishes printed and web-based reports, popular books and information resources. It offers opportunities to take part in archaeological investigation through its annual training excavation 'Archaeology Live', and hosts the Community Archaeologist for York.

== Bibliography ==
- Jones, Andrew (1990). "Archaeological Reconstruction and Education at the Jorvik Viking Centre and Archaeological Research Centre, York, UK". In Planel, Philippe; Stone, Peter G. (eds.). Constructed Past: Experimental Archaeology, Education and the Public. London, UK: Routledge. pp. 258–268. ISBN 9781134828289.
