= Jorvik Viking Centre =

Museum in York, England

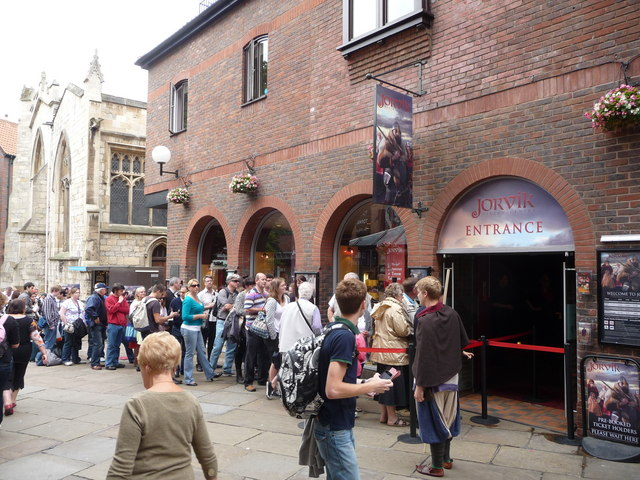
- Established: 1984
- Location: York, England
- Coordinates: 53°57′26.9″N 1°04′49.1″W
- Website: www.jorvikvikingcentre.co.uk

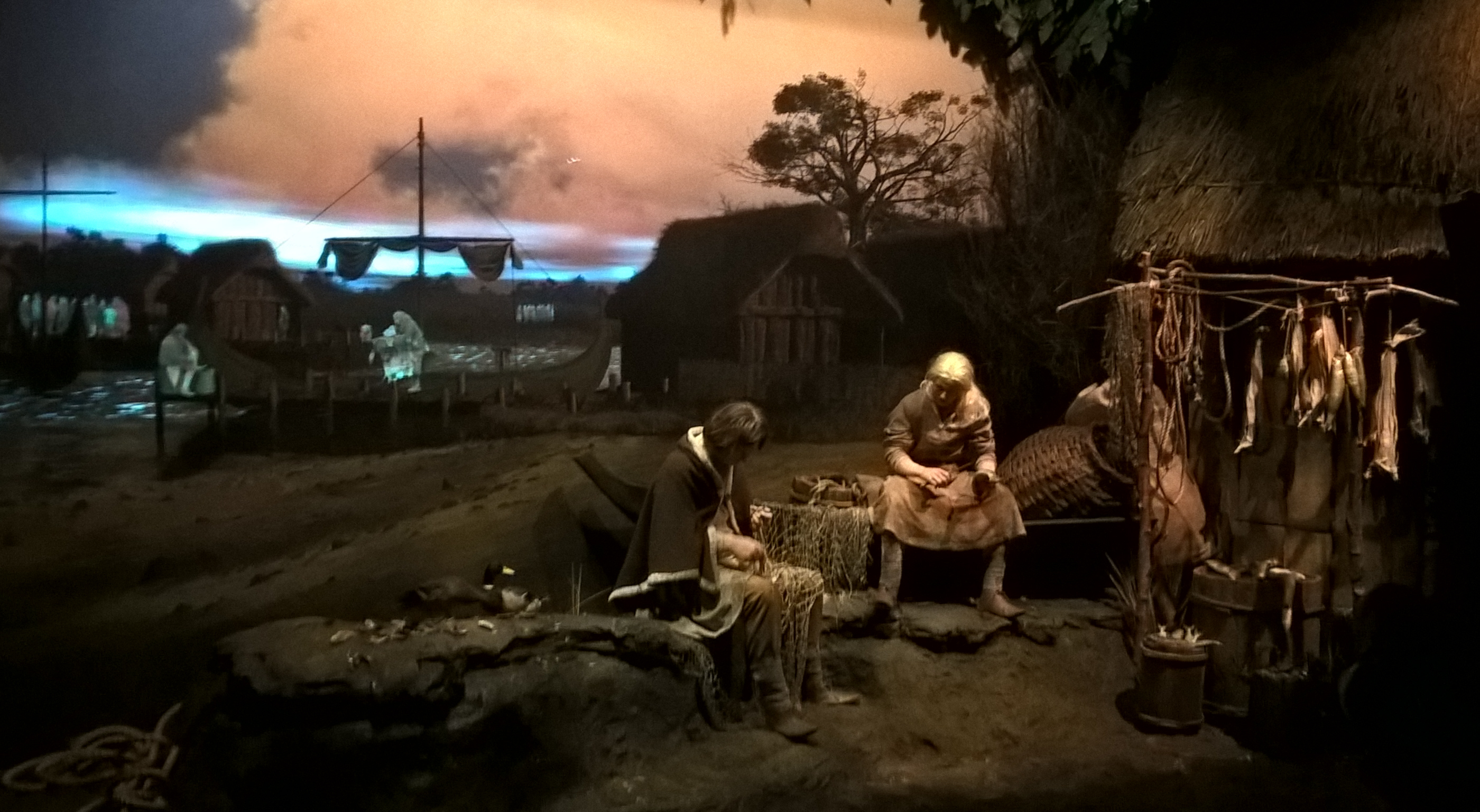
Fishermen work and talk as part of the Time Warp experience

Jorvik Viking Centre is a museum and visitor attraction in York, England, containing lifelike mannequins and life-size dioramas depicting Viking life in the city. Visitors are taken through the dioramas in 'time capsule' carriages equipped with speakers. It was created by York Archaeological Trust and opened in 1984. Its name is derived from Jórvík, the Old Norse name for York and the surrounding Viking Kingdom of Yorkshire.

== Origins ==
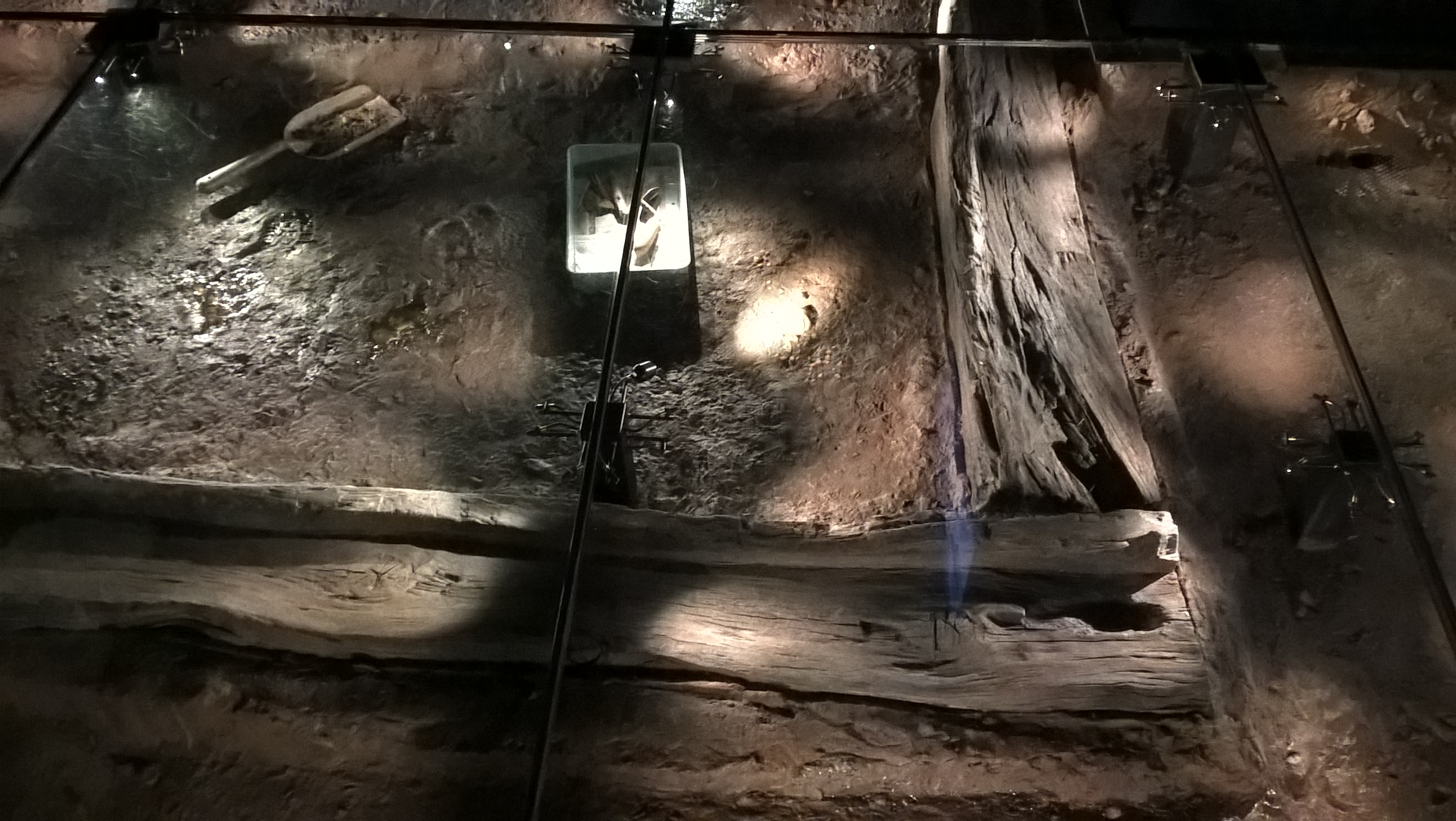
Under a glass floor, the original archeological dig is reproduced with actual timbers

In the 1850s, confectioner Thomas Craven acquired a site in Coppergate. When he died in 1862 his widow Mary Ann Craven continued the business and a century later, in 1966, Cravens relocated to a new factory on the outskirts of the city. Between 1976 and 1981, after the old factory was demolished, and prior to the building of the Coppergate Shopping Centre (an open-air pedestrian shopping centre which now occupies the enlarged site), the York Archaeological Trust, a charity founded in 1972 by Peter Addyman, conducted extensive excavations in the area. Well-preserved remains of some of the timber buildings of the Viking city of Jorvík were discovered, along with workshops, fences, animal pens, privies, pits and wells, together with durable materials and artefacts of the time, such as pottery, metalwork and bones. Unusually, wood, leather, textiles, and plant and animal remains from the period around 900 AD, were also discovered to be preserved in oxygen-deprived wet clay. In all, over 40,000 objects were recovered.

The trust recreated the excavated part of Jorvik on the site, peopled with figures, sounds and smells, as well as pigsties, fish market and latrines, with a view to bringing the Viking city fully to life using innovative interpretative methods. The Jorvik Viking Centre was designed by John Sunderland and opened in April 1984.

== 21st century ==
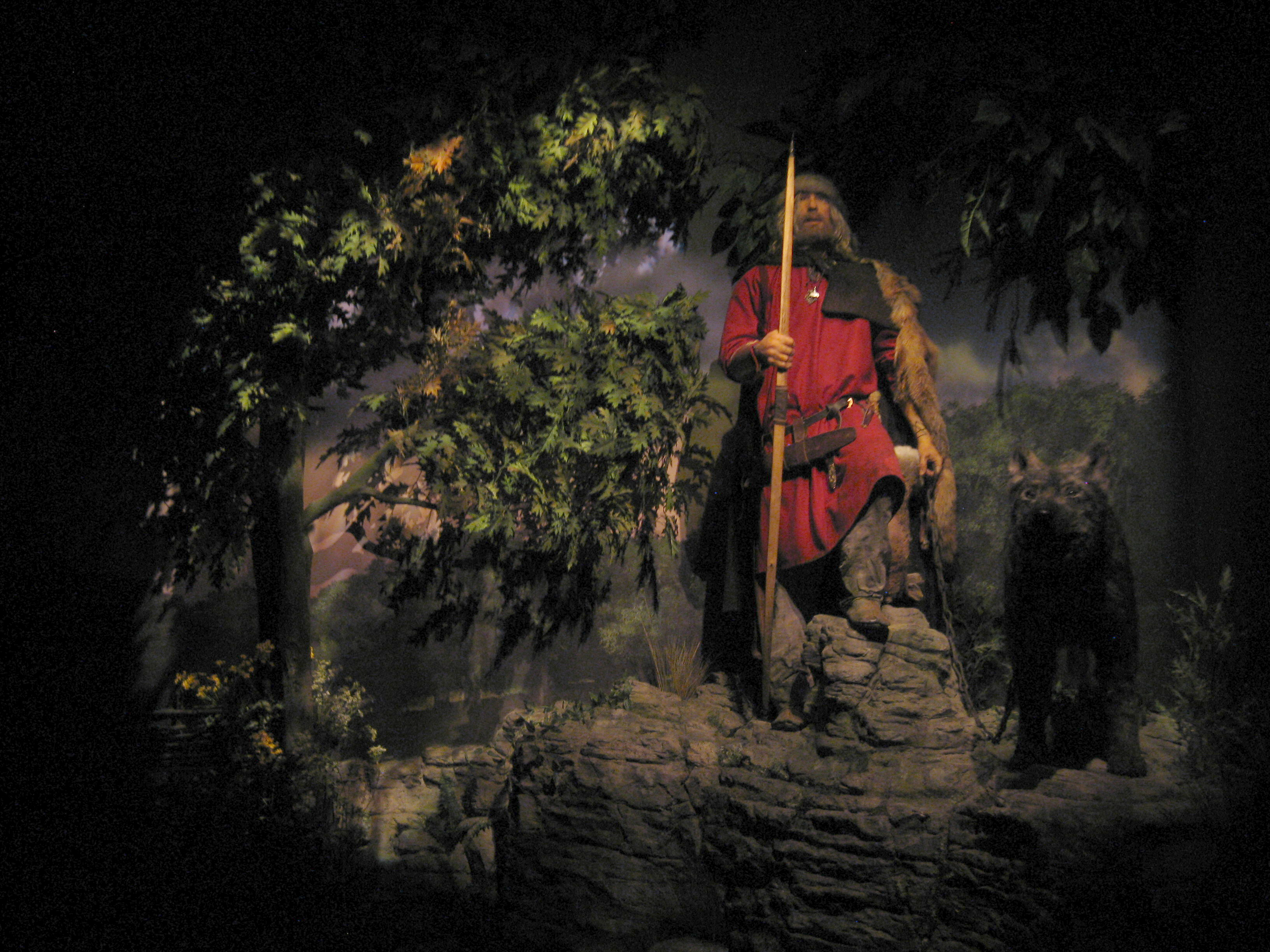
"Wilkom in Jorvik" says the Viking at the start of the Time Warp Ride

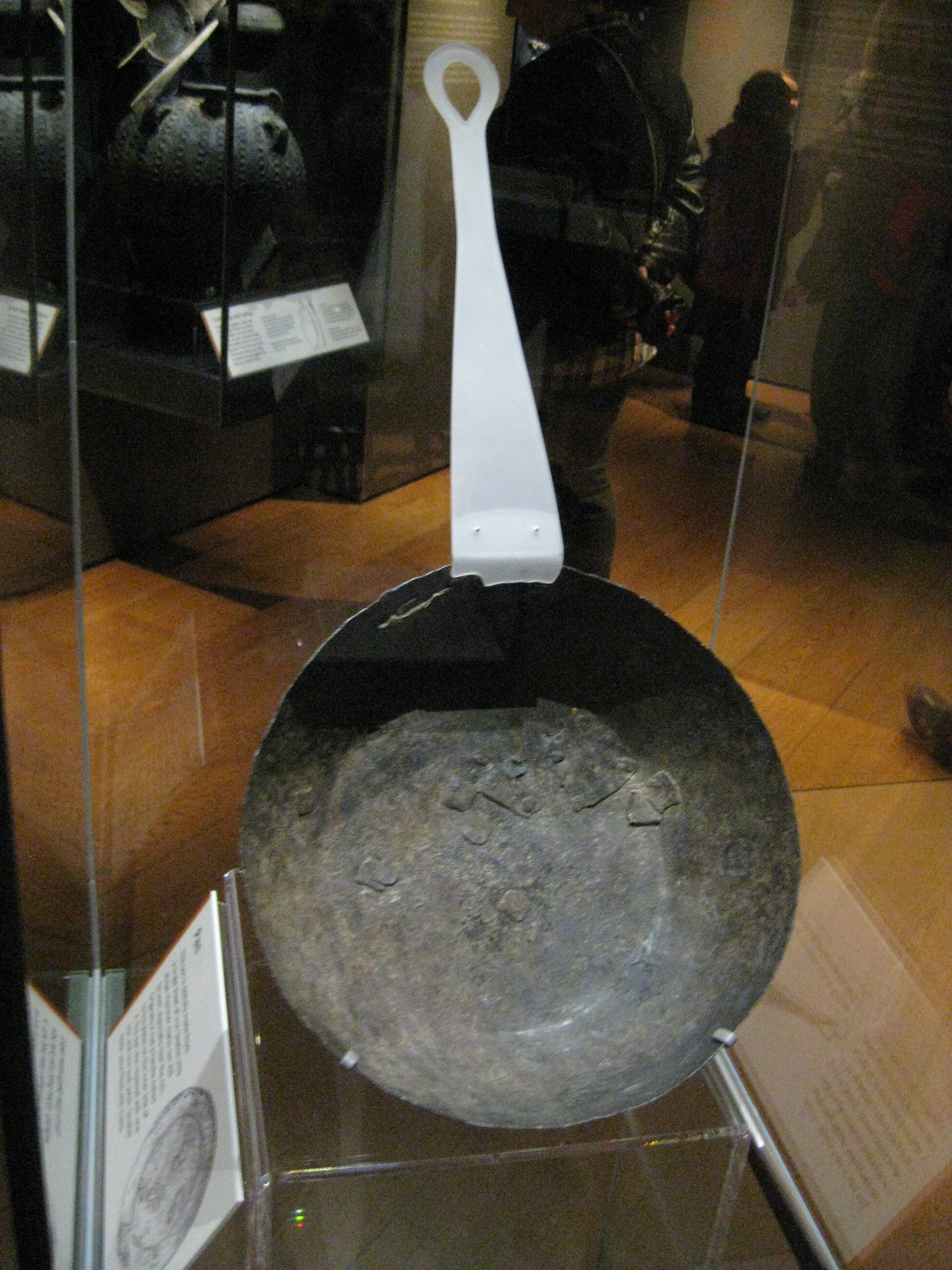
Cooking pan in the museum

In 2001, the centre was refurbished and enlarged at a cost of £5 million, and a further investment of £1 million followed in February 2010. These investments were used to "intensify the message" at Jorvik, and included such changes as extending the ride time to 12 minutes, as well as adding more high-tech elements, which included a hike in "the technology and animation elements," and increasing "the sensory stimuli to include smells, more sounds, heat, cold and damp." Visitors were taken back to 5:30 pm 25 October 960 AD in a time-capsule, and then embarked on a tour of a reconstructed Viking settlement featuring aromas and "life-like animated figures, made by laser technology from skeletons found on the site."

The third incarnation of Jorvik was opened in February 2010, coinciding with the start of the annual Viking Festival in York.

The centre was significantly affected by the flooding in Northern England in December 2015, with extensive water damage to the building and exhibits. The most valuable Viking artefacts were moved to prevent damage. The museum reopened in April 2017. The timeline was moved, so visitors now experience a September day in 975AD, and the ride slowed down, extending the ride time to 16 minutes. Some of the animatronic characters were voiced by researchers from the University of York speaking in Old Norse.

By October 2022, the centre had received 20 million visitors.

Beyond the settlement tour is an extensive museum area, which combines an exhibition of some 800 finds from the site with interactive displays and the opportunity to learn about tenth-century life and to discuss it with "Viking" staff. Among the exhibits is a replica of the Coppergate Helmet, which was found near the site of the centre and is now in the Yorkshire Museum.

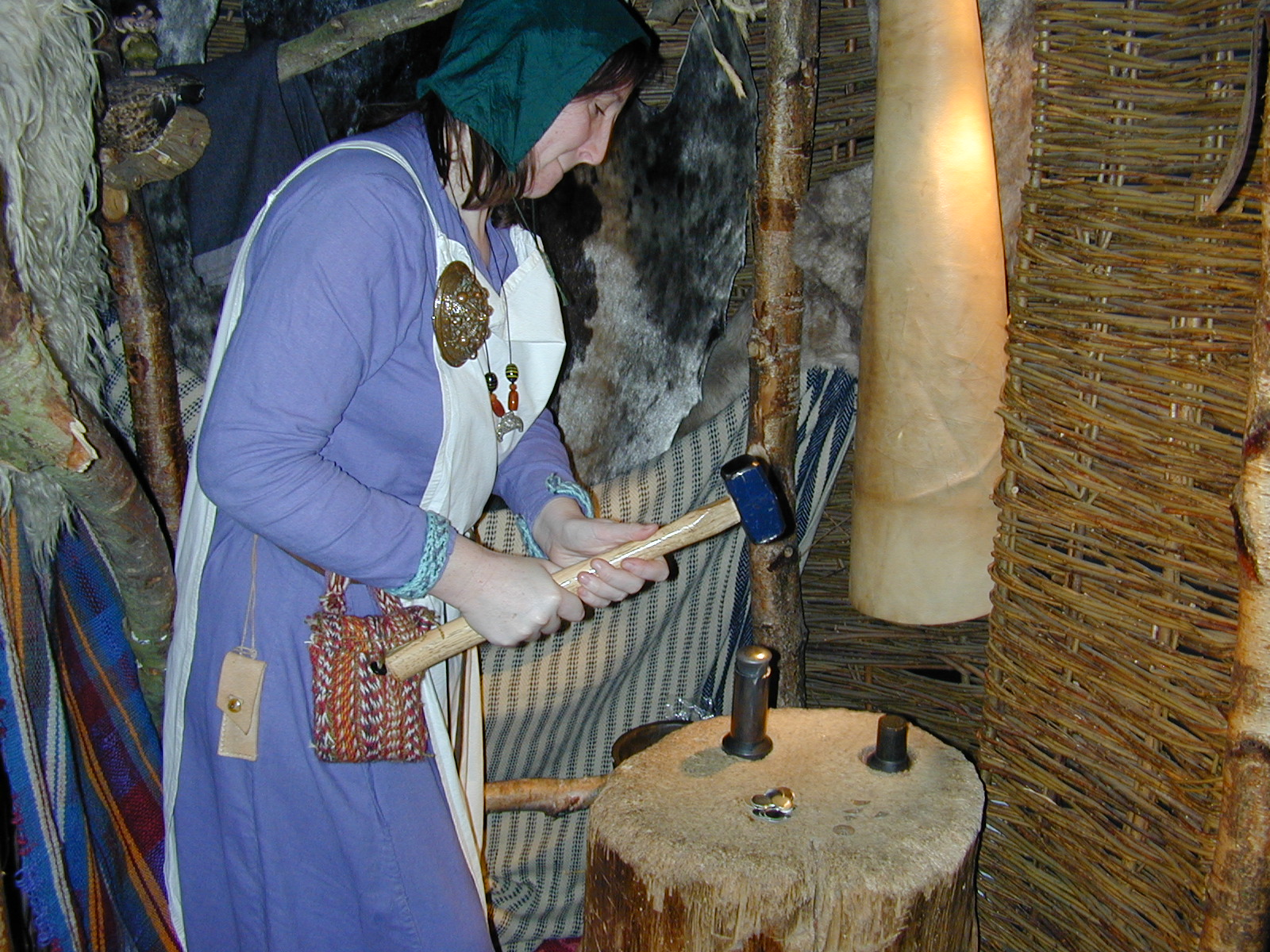
Demonstration of coin making

=== Jorvik Viking models ===
Graham Ibbeson created the lifelike mannequins used in the original Jorvik experience. At first the faces of these mannequins were modelled from modern day people. However, through advances in facial reconstruction technology, eight new mannequins have now been modelled on skulls found in a Viking age cemetery, although there is no guarantee that the skulls were Norse, and there is the possibility that they were Saxon.

=== Viking Festival ===
The centre organizes the annual JORVIK Viking Festival that takes place in the second week of February. The festival is set up in tradition of an ancient Viking festival known as "Jolablot". The festival includes combat re-enactment involving volunteers from all over the world.

== Public response ==
JORVIK Viking Centre has been called "one of Britain's most popular attractions." The BBC spoke of the "Time Warp" experience as "a new art form".

JORVIK has been criticized as a "pop-up book view of history" and its presentation of the past has been labelled "Disney-like". Anthony Gaynor, one of the creators of the centre, responded in 1989 by stating: "We're making history accessible and enjoyable to the general public. You can't do that if you wrap it in a lot of academic foliage."

== Influence on other attractions ==
Jorvik Viking Centre is not billed as a museum but as an "experience"; this type of educational representation of the past, known as a "Time Warp" experience, has become increasingly popular with the creation of Jorvik. It inspired other such sites as "The Canterbury Tales" where visitors could join Geoffrey Chaucer's pilgrimage.

== See also ==
- The Lloyds Bank coprolite is exhibited there.

== Notes ==
- Evans, Antonia, ed. (2002). The York Book. York: Blue Bridge. ISBN 0-9542749-0-3.
