= 2019 Boston Borough Council election =

2019 UK local government election

Results of the 2019 Boston Borough Council election

Elections for Boston Borough Council, which governs as a second-tier authority for the Borough of Boston were held on Thursday 2 May 2019. The election was held on the same day as other local elections.

== Results summary ==
2019 Boston Borough Council election
Party	Seats	Gains	Losses	Net gain/loss	Seats %	Votes %	Votes	+/−
Conservative	16	5	2	▲3	53.3	45.0	10,050	
Independent	11	9	0	▲9	36.7	28.1	6,288	
Labour	2	1	1	Steady	6.7	19.3	4,322	
UKIP	1	0	12	▼12	3.3	3.9	871	
Blue Revolution	0	0	0	Steady	0.0	1.9	416	
VPP	0	0	0	Steady	0.0	1.4	310	
Liberal Democrats	0	0	0	Steady	0.0	0.4	86	

== Ward results ==
=== Coastal ===
Coastal
Party	Candidate	Votes	%	±%
Independent	Peter Bedford	441	45.2	
Independent	Judith Welbourn	317	32.5	
UKIP	Felicity Ransome	265	27.2	
Conservative	Katherine Chalmers	234	24.0	
Conservative	Susan Bell	231	23.7	
Labour	Tracii Edwards	150	15.4	
Turnout		979	33.9	
Independent gain from Conservative				
Independent gain from UKIP				

=== Fenside ===
Fenside
Party	Candidate	Votes	%	±%
Labour Co-op	Alan Bell	242	35.5	
Conservative	Anton Dani	223	32.7	
Independent	Patrisha Wainwright	215	31.5	
Labour Co-op	Joseph Pearson	206	30.2	
Blue Revolution	Richard Thornalley	107	15.7	
Liberal Democrats	Jason Stevenson	86	12.6	
Turnout		694	22.4	
Labour Co-op hold				
Conservative gain from UKIP				

=== Fishtoft ===
Fishtoft
Party	Candidate	Votes	%	±%
Conservative	Judith Skinner	795	59.2	
Conservative	Paul Skinner	708	52.8	
Conservative	Jonathan Noble	625	46.6	
Independent	Oswald Snell	622	46.3	
Labour	Jane Hancock	306	22.8	
Turnout		1,366	26.3	
Conservative gain from UKIP				
Conservative hold				
Conservative hold				

=== Five Villages ===
Five Villages
Party	Candidate	Votes	%	±%
Conservative	Aaron Spencer	470	52.0	
Conservative	Michael Cooper	456	50.4	
VPP	George Reid	310	34.3	
Labour	Ewa Thorley	220	24.3	
Turnout		929	29.1	
Conservative hold				
Conservative hold				

=== Kirton and Frampton ===
Kirton and Frampton
Party	Candidate	Votes	%	±%
Independent	Peter Watson	873	68.7	
Conservative	Shaun Blackman	571	44.9	
Conservative	Nigel Welton	511	40.2	
Labour	Patrick Glennon	226	17.8	
Labour	Michael Gall	216	17.0	
Turnout		1,285	25.2	
Independent gain from UKIP				
Conservative hold				
Conservative hold				

=== Old Leake and Wrangle ===
Old Leake and Wrangle
Party	Candidate	Votes	%	±%
Conservative	Thomas Ashton	505	55.4	
Conservative	Frank Pickett	428	47.0	
Independent	Barrie Pierpoint	400	43.9	
Labour	Christopher Dorrington	112	12.3	
Turnout		932	33.3	
Conservative hold				
Conservative gain from UKIP				

=== Skirbeck ===
Skirbeck
Party	Candidate	Votes	%	±%
Independent	Colin Woodcock	512	46.8	
Independent	Anne Dorrian	412	37.7	
Conservative	Alistair Arundell	307	28.1	
Labour Co-op	Paul Gleeson	276	25.2	
Labour Co-op	Paul Kenny	271	24.8	
Labour Co-op	Jacqueline Barton	265	24.2	
Conservative	Matthew Barnes	254	23.2	
Conservative	Sarah Fitzgerald	253	23.1	
Blue Revolution	Christopher Moore	186	17.0	
Turnout		1,103	22.3	
Independent gain from UKIP				
Independent gain from Labour				
Conservative hold				

=== St. Thomas ===
St. Thomas
Party	Candidate	Votes	%	±%
Independent	Alison Austin	404	72.0	
Independent	Darron Abbott	117	20.9	
Labour	Mauro Maglione	40	7.1	
Majority				
Turnout		563	31.3	
Independent hold		Swing		

=== Staniland ===
Staniland
Party	Candidate	Votes	%	±%
Independent	Bernard Rush	295	41.0	
Conservative	Deborah Evans	282	39.2	
Labour	Pamela Kenny	221	30.7	
Conservative	Martin Howard	216	30.0	
Labour	Benjamin Cook	179	24.9	
Turnout		728	26.2	
Independent gain from UKIP				
Conservative hold				

=== Station ===
Station
Party	Candidate	Votes	%	±%
Labour	Paul Goodale	110	37.0	
Blue Revolution	Michael Gilbert	72	24.2	
UKIP	Sue Ransome	67	22.6	
Conservative	Gerald Roffey	48	16.2	
Majority				
Turnout		301	22.8	
Labour gain from UKIP		Swing		

=== Swineshead and Holland Fen ===
Swineshead and Holland Fen
Party	Candidate	Votes	%	±%
Conservative	Chelcei Sharman	581	71.2	
Conservative	Georges Cornah	577	70.7	
Labour	Janette Finch	197	24.1	
Turnout		884	25.5	
Conservative hold				
Conservative gain from UKIP				

=== Trinity ===
Trinity
Party	Candidate	Votes	%	±%
Conservative	Yvonne Stevens	431	46.9	
Conservative	Martin Griggs	418	45.5	
Labour	Andrew Finch	265	28.9	
Labour	William Lawrence	253	27.6	
Independent	Andrea Keal	218	23.7	
Turnout		931	27.8	
Conservative gain from UKIP				
Conservative hold				

=== West ===
West
Party	Candidate	Votes	%	±%
Independent	Stephen Woodliffe	252	44.3	
Conservative	Paula Cooper	198	34.8	
Labour	Andrew Cook	68	12.0	
Blue Revolution	Gavin Lee	51	9.0	
Majority				
Turnout		569	33.5	
Independent gain from Conservative		Swing		

=== Witham ===
Witham
Party	Candidate	Votes	%	±%
Independent	Neill Hastie	288	37.3	
UKIP	Viven Edge	244	31.6	
Conservative	Alastair Hamilton	216	27.9	
Labour	Wendy Gleeson	197	25.5	
Labour	Andrew Izard	187	24.2	
Conservative	Anna Szwedzinska	176	22.8	
Turnout		781	25.1	
Independent gain from UKIP				
UKIP hold				

=== Wyberton ===
Wyberton
Party	Candidate	Votes	%	±%
Independent	Richard Austin	582	58.8	
Independent	Tracey Abbott	340	34.4	
Conservative	David Brown	336	34.0	
UKIP	Donald Ransome	295	29.8	
Labour	Malcolm Limbert	115	11.6	
Turnout		993	28.9	
Independent hold				
Independent gain from UKIP				

== Changes 2019–2023 ==
- In the Five Villages ward, Conservative councillor Aaron Spencer, the then Leader of the Council, resigned the leadership and left the Conservative group to sit as an independent at a Full Council meeting on 20 January 2020, following criticism from Conservative colleagues of his conduct as leader; as a result the Conservatives lost their majority on the council.
- Fellow Five Villages councillor Michael Cooper, himself a former council leader, had earlier had a spell sitting as an unaligned councillor before rejoining the Conservative group in January 2020 and being restored as chairman of the planning committee. He was recorded as an independent again by early 2023, and did not stand for re-election.
- In Skirbeck, Conservative councillor Martin Howard, who won the December 2019 by-election below, was likewise recorded as an independent by early 2023.

=== By-elections ===
==== Kirton and Frampton ====
This by-election filled the seat won by Conservative councillor Shaun Blackman at the 2019 election, following his resignation.

Kirton and Frampton by-election: 12 December 2019
Party	Candidate	Votes	%	±%
Conservative	David Brown	2,038	69.3	New
Independent	Lorraine O'Connor	453	15.4	New
Liberal Democrats	Alan Taylor	415	14.1	New
Majority		1,585	53.9	
Rejected ballots		33	1.12	
Turnout		2,939	56.5	
Registered electors		5,202		
Conservative hold		Swing		

==== Skirbeck ====
This by-election filled the seat won by Conservative councillor Alistair Arundell at the 2019 election.

Skirbeck by-election: 12 December 2019
Party	Candidate	Votes	%	±%
Conservative	Martin Howard	955	48.4	New
Labour Co-op	Jacqueline Barton	437	22.2	−2.0
Independent	Lyndon Jenkins	195	9.9	New
Independent	Sue Ransome	112	5.7	New
Liberal Democrats	Jason Stevenson	100	5.1	New
Blue Revolution	Christopher Moore	62	3.1	−13.9
Majority		518	26.3	
Rejected ballots		11	0.56	
Turnout		1,972	36.89	
Registered electors		5,075		
Conservative hold		Swing		

This by-election filled the seat won by independent councillor Colin Woodcock at the 2019 election.

Skirbeck by-election: 6 May 2021
Party	Candidate	Votes	%	±%
Conservative	Katherine Chalmers	338	34.1	New
Independent	Dale Broughton	307	31.0	New
Labour Co-op	Jacqueline Barton	210	21.2	−3.0
For the People not the Party	Christopher Moore	88	8.9	−8.1
Independent	Christopher Cardwell	36	3.6	New
Majority		31	3.1	
Rejected ballots		11	1.11	
Turnout		990	19.5	
Registered electors		5,074		
Conservative gain from Independent				

==== Swineshead and Holland Fen ====
Conservative councillor Chelcei Sharman (later known as Chelcei Trafford) resigned in November 2022. As her term was due to end at the May 2023 election, no by-election was held and the seat remained vacant.
