= 2025 Lincolnshire County Council election =

2025 English local election

- 1 May 2025

All 70 seats on Lincolnshire County Council 36 seats needed for a majority
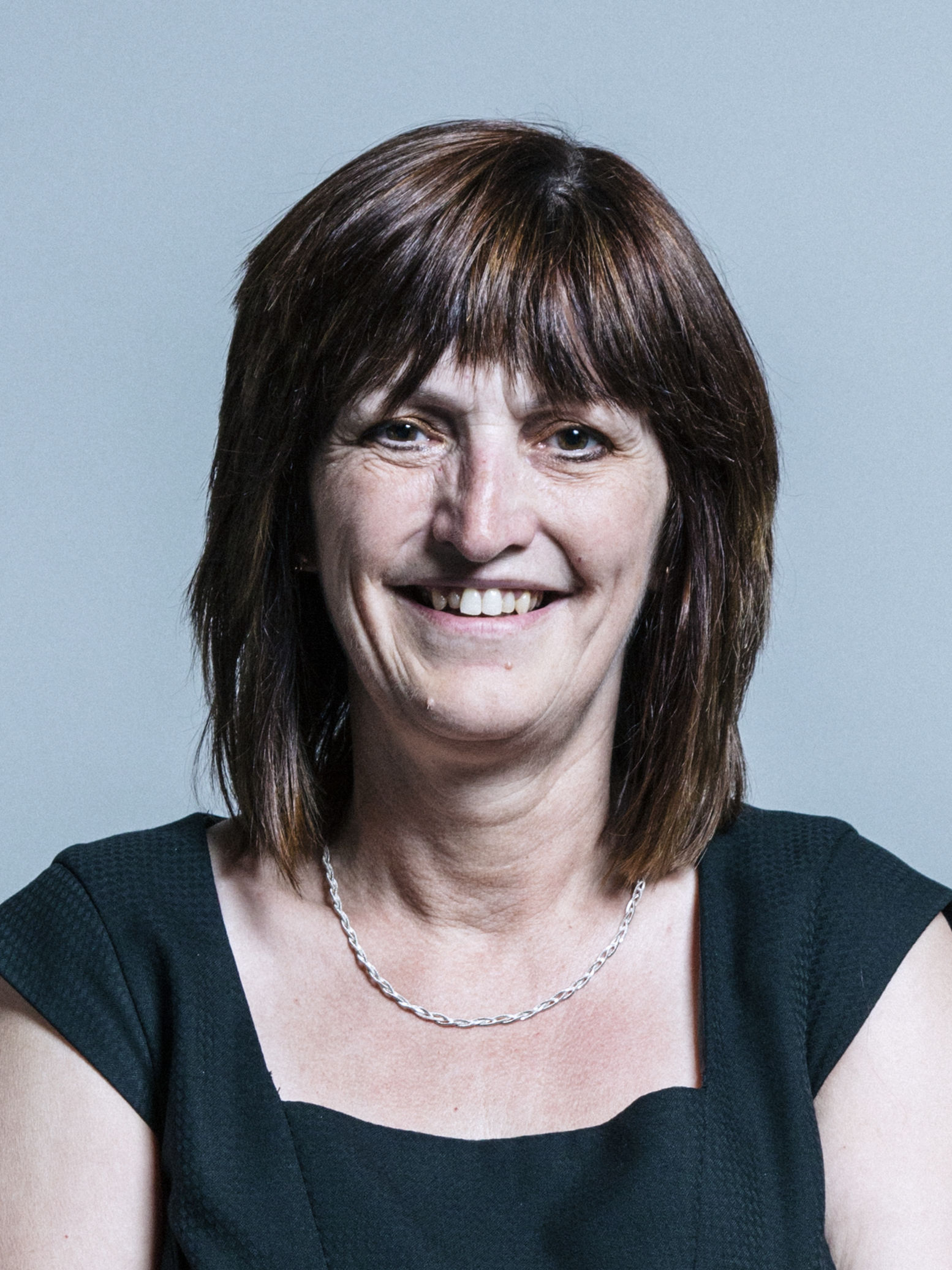

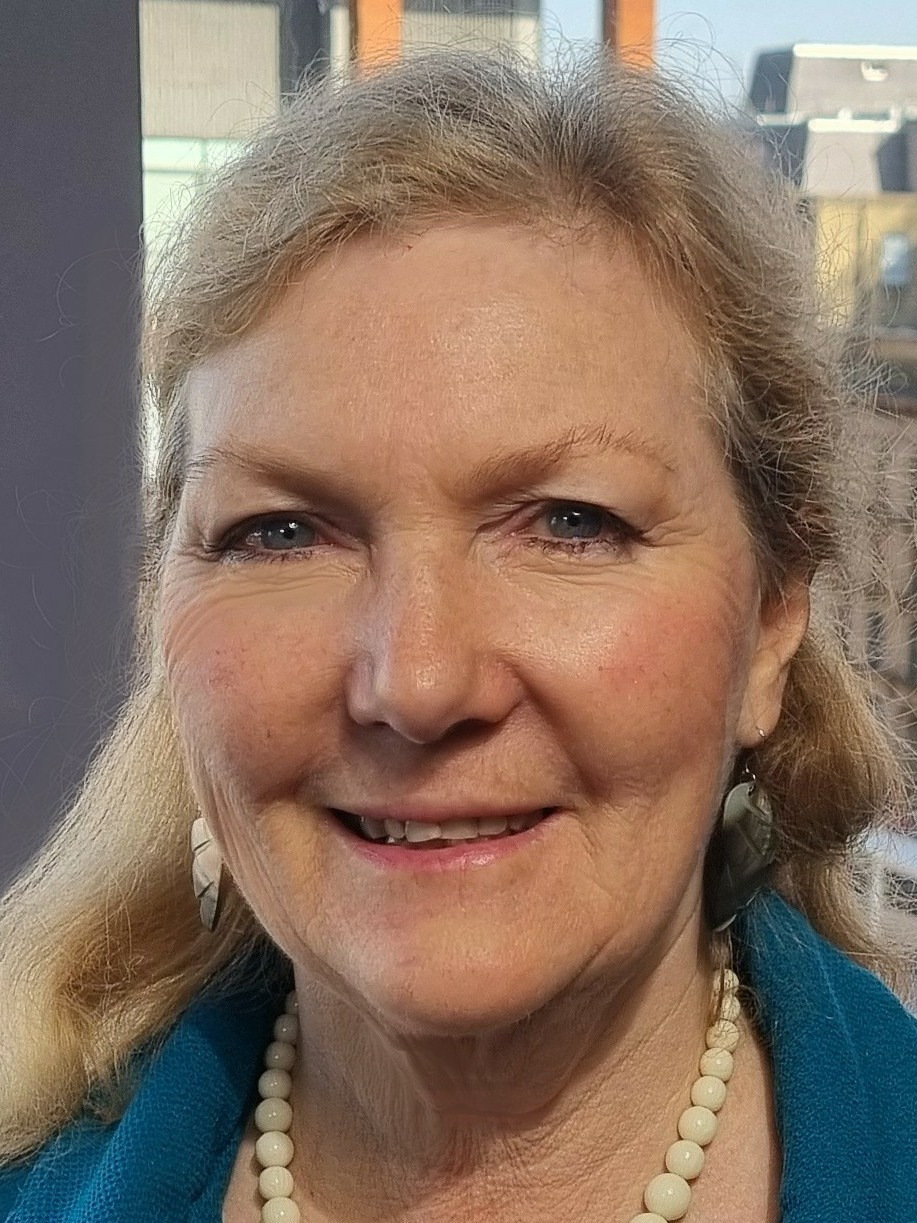
	First party	Second party	Third party
Leader	Robert Gibson	Martin Hill	Trevor Young
Party	Reform	Conservative	Liberal Democrats
Leader since	1 March 2025	24 March 2005	May 2021
Leader's seat	Spalding East	Folkingham Rural	Gainsborough Trent
Last election	0 seats, 0.2%	54 seats, 55.5%	3 seats, 5.2%
Seats before	3	54 (Note: Including one vacant seat for the St Giles division last held by Conservative councillor Nicola Clarke until her resignation on health grounds in November 2024.)	3
Seats won	44	14	5
Seat change	▲44	▼40	▲2
Popular vote	73,207	50,783	17,151
Percentage	39.2%	27.2%	9.2%
Swing	▲39.0 pp	▼28.3 pp	▲4.0 pp
	Fourth party	Fifth party	Sixth party
Leader	Karen Lee	Phil Dilks (Note: Three of the independent councillors formed a group with the Lincolnshire Independent councillor prior to the election, led by independent councillor Phil Dilks. The other two independent councillors were not aligned to any group.)	Marianne Overton
Party	Labour	Independent	Lincolnshire Independent
Leader since	3 August 2023	May 2021	18 July 2008
Leader's seat	Ermine & Cathedral	Deepings East	Bassingham & Welbourn
Last election	4 seats, 17.4%	5 seats, 11.5%	1 seat, 3.1%
Seats before	4	5	1
Seats won	3	3	1
Seat change	▼1	▼2	Steady
Popular vote	20,092	10,161	4,078
Percentage	10.7%	5.5%	2.2%
Swing	▼6.7 pp	▼6.0 pp	▼0.9 pp

- Composition of the Lincolnshire County Council after the election.
Leader before election
Martin Hill
Conservative
Leader after election
Sean Matthews
Reform

The 2025 Lincolnshire County Council election was held on 1 May 2025 to elect members to Lincolnshire County Council in Lincolnshire, England. All 70 seats were up for election. This was on the same day as other local elections including the inaugural 2025 Greater Lincolnshire mayoral election. The council was under Conservative majority control prior to the election. Reform UK won a majority of the seats on the council at the election.

== Background ==
At the previous 2021 election, the Conservatives won a majority of seats.

== Previous council composition ==
After 2021 election		Before 2025 election	
Party	Seats	Party	Seats
Conservative	54	Conservative	53
Labour	4	Labour	4
Liberal Democrats	3	Liberal Democrats	3
Reform	0	Reform	3
SH Independents	3	SH Independents	0
Lincolnshire Independent	1	Lincolnshire Independent	1
Independent	5	Independent	5
Vacant	N/A	Vacant	1

=== Changes 2021–2025 ===
- November 2021: Bob Adams (Conservative) dies – by-election held February 2022
- February 2022: Charlotte Vernon (Conservative) wins by-election
- August 2022: Angela Newton (South Holland Independents) dies – by-election held December 2022
- December 2022: Manzur Hasan (South Holland Independents) wins by-election
- March 2023: Mike Thompson (Conservative) resigns – by-election held May 2023
- May 2023: Alan Briggs (Conservative) wins by-election
- August 2023: Rob Parker (Labour) resigns – by-election held September 2023; Ray Wootten (Conservative) dies – by-election held November 2023; Alison Austin (independent) joins South Holland Independents
- September 2023: Neil Murray (Labour) wins by-election
- November 2023: Paul Martin (Conservative) wins by-election
- March 2024: Julie Killey (Labour) dies – by-election held May 2024
- May 2024: Debbie Armiger (Labour) wins by-election
- November 2024: Nicola Clarke (Conservative) resigns – seat left vacant until 2025 election
- March 2025: Robert Gibson (South Holland Independents), Manzur Hasan (South Holland Independents), and Jane King (South Holland Independents) join Reform UK Remaining member of South Holland Independents group, Alison Austin, reverts to being an independent, not aligned to any group.

== Summary ==
Prior to the election, the council was under Conservative majority control. The council had only three Reform UK councillors prior to the election, all of whom had been elected as South Holland Independents but joined Reform UK in March 2025. The election saw Reform UK win 44 of the 70 seats on the council, giving it an overall majority. After the election, Reform UK chose Sean Matthews to be their new group leader on the council, and he was formally appointed as the new leader of the council at the subsequent annual council meeting on 23 May 2025.

=== Election result ===
2025 Lincolnshire County Council election
Party	Candidates	Seats	Gains	Losses	Net gain/loss	Seats %	Votes %	Votes	+/−
Reform	70	44	44	0	▲44	62.9	39.2	73,207	+39.0
Conservative	70	14	0	40	▼40	20.0	27.2	50,783	-28.3
Liberal Democrats	67	5	2	0	▲2	7.1	9.2	17,151	+4.0
Labour	67	3	0	1	▼1	4.3	10.7	20,092	-6.7
Independent	25	3	0	2	▼2	4.3	5.5	10,161	-6.0
Lincolnshire Independent	9	1	0	0	Steady	1.4	2.2	4,078	-0.9
Green	37	0	0	0	Steady	0.0	3.4	6,300	+1.1
Boston Independent	6	0	0	0	Steady	0.0	1.0	1,878	N/A
SH Independents	3	0	0	3	▼3	0.0	0.8	1,453	-2.0
Blue Revolution	4	0	0	0	Steady	0.0	<0.1	136	N/A
TUSC	1	0	0	0	Steady	0.0	<0.1	90	-0.1
Homeland	1	0	0	0	Steady	0.0	<0.1	67	N/A
Liberal	2	0	0	0	Steady	0.0	<0.1	63	±0.0
SDP	2	0	0	0	Steady	0.0	<0.1	62	N/A
English Democrat	1	0	0	0	Steady	0.0	<0.1	48	N/A
Libertarian	1	0	0	0	Steady	0.0	<0.1	30	N/A
UKIP	2	0	0	0	Steady	0.0	<0.1	24	N/A

== Division results by district ==
=== Boston ===
Boston Coastal
Party	Candidate	Votes	%	±%
Reform	Alistair Arundell	1,451	47.7	N/A
Boston Independent	Dale Broughton	754	24.8	−8.5
Conservative	Paul Skinner	551	18.1	−38.7
Labour	Liz Fenton	161	5.3	−4.5
Liberal Democrats	Jacob Flear	74	2.4	N/A
English Democrat	David Dickason	48	1.6	N/A
Majority		697	22.9	−0.6
Turnout		3,049	35.7	+2.2
Registered electors		8,538		
Reform gain from Conservative		Swing		

Boston North
Party	Candidate	Votes	%	±%
Reform	Maggie Cullen	806	46.5	N/A
Conservative	Anton Dani	327	18.9	−33.0
Boston Independent	Sandeep Ghosh	259	14.9	N/A
Labour	Carole Clark	143	8.3	−10.9
Green	Michael Broadhurst	116	6.7	N/A
Liberal Democrats	Mandy Snee	42	2.4	−2.9
Blue Revolution	Carol Broomfield-Douglas	40	2.3	N/A
Majority		479	27.6	−5.1
Turnout		1,748	22.1	+1.1
Registered electors		7,920		
Reform gain from Conservative		Swing		

Boston Rural
Party	Candidate	Votes	%	±%
Reform	Paul Lock	1,435	51.2	N/A
Conservative	Stuart Evans	786	28.0	−49.5
Boston Independent	David Scoot	228	8.1	N/A
Labour	Mark Deith	198	7.1	−5.7
Liberal Democrats	Lorraine O'Connor	156	5.6	N/A
Majority		649	23.2	−41.5
Turnout		2,839	30.2	−0.8
Registered electors		9,395		
Reform gain from Conservative		Swing		

Boston South
Party	Candidate	Votes	%	±%
Reform	Barry Daish	1,148	52.0	N/A
Conservative	James Cantwell	484	21.9	−10.9
Labour	Richard Linnell	139	6.3	−6.0
Independent	Sue Ransome	139	6.3	+1.8
Liberal Democrats	Ralph Pryke	120	5.4	N/A
Boston Independent	Lina Savickiene	111	5.0	N/A
Green	Nathan Wolf	66	3.0	N/A
Majority		664	30.1	+22.1
Turnout		2,221	26.0	−0.5
Registered electors		8,540		
Reform gain from Independent		Swing		

Boston West
Party	Candidate	Votes	%	±%
Reform	Michael Cheyne	848	52.5	N/A
Conservative	Paula Ashleigh-Morris	274	17.0	−25.9
Labour	Roger Dawson	171	10.6	−7.2
Boston Independent	Barrie Pierpoint	147	9.1	N/A
Liberal Democrats	Nick Scarborough	86	5.3	+1.8
Green	Jonathan Wolf	57	3.5	N/A
Blue Revolution	Richard Thornalley	31	1.9	N/A
Majority		574	35.5	+20.5
Turnout		1,628	23.0	−1.2
Registered electors		7,069		
Reform gain from Conservative		Swing		

Skirbeck
Party	Candidate	Votes	%	±%
Reform	Sam French	966	46.4	N/A
Conservative	Martin Griggs	415	19.9	−22.5
Boston Independent	Neil Drayton	379	18.2	N/A
Green	Chris Moore	139	6.7	N/A
Labour	Jake Swinburne	136	6.5	−8.4
Liberal Democrats	Baptiste Velan	47	2.3	N/A
Majority		551	26.5	+17.5
Turnout		2,101	25.2	+1.0
Registered electors		8,329		
Reform gain from Conservative		Swing		

=== Lincoln ===
Birchwood
Party	Candidate	Votes	%	±%
Reform	Brenda Collier	946	41.9	N/A
Conservative	Eddie Strengiel	566	25.1	−33.9
Labour	Amanda Spalding	501	22.2	−9.7
Liberal Democrats	Jim Charters	245	10.9	+7.3
Majority		380	16.8	−10.3
Turnout		2,273	30.2	0.0
Registered electors		7,831		
Reform gain from Conservative		Swing		

Boultham
Party	Candidate	Votes	%	±%
Labour	Kev Clarke	720	35.3	−13.0
Reform	Mike Bailey	598	29.4	N/A
Liberal Democrats	Debbie Grant	389	19.1	+13.9
Conservative	Dave Nash	190	9.3	−27.8
Green	David Kenyon	140	6.9	−2.5
Majority		122	5.9	−5.3
Turnout		2,044	29.1	−0.7
Registered electors		7,032		
Labour hold		Swing		

Carholme
Party	Candidate	Votes	%	±%
Labour	Neil Murray *	1,163	45.2	−12.6
Reform	Matthew Howkins	516	20.1	N/A
Green	Charles Rodgers	349	13.6	+2.9
Conservative	Freddie Easters	264	10.3	−14.2
Liberal Democrats	Aidan Turner	214	8.3	+4.4
Liberal	Tinashe Chipawe	35	1.4	+0.1
Blue Revolution	Mike Gilbert	32	1.2	N/A
Majority		647	25.1	−7.6
Turnout		2,586	33.3	−3.7
Registered electors		7,770		
Labour hold		Swing		

Ermine & Cathedral
Party	Candidate	Votes	%	±%
Labour	Karen Lee	997	35.5	−9.0
Reform	Elizabeth Hughes	959	34.1	N/A
Conservative	Tom Hulme	429	15.3	−29.2
Green	Valerie Wikinson	222	7.9	+2.4
Liberal Democrats	James Brown	177	6.3	+0.8
Liberal	Charles Shaw	28	1.0	N/A
Majority		38	1.4	+1.4
Turnout		2,841	32.3	−1.7
Registered electors		8,803		
Labour hold		Swing		

Hartsholme
Party	Candidate	Votes	%	±%
Reform	Stuart Grantham	940	39.6	N/A
Labour	Biff Bean	923	38.9	+1.3
Conservative	Kai Harrison	358	15.1	−35.8
Liberal Democrats	Steven Whaley	153	6.4	+3.0
Majority		17	0.7	−12.6
Turnout		2,387	28.8	+0.3
Registered electors		8,293		
Reform gain from Conservative		Swing		

Park
Party	Candidate	Votes	%	±%
Liberal Democrats	Natasha Chapman	808	39.5	+22.6
Labour	Debra Armiger	597	29.2	−17.7
Reform	Tony Todd	440	21.5	+18.1
Conservative	Joey Gwinn	109	5.3	−15.8
TUSC	Nick Parker	90	4.4	+2.0
Majority		211	10.3	−15.5
Turnout		2,062	23.0	−3.4
Registered electors		8,983		
Liberal Democrats gain from Labour		Swing		

St Giles
Party	Candidate	Votes	%	±%
Liberal Democrats	Martin Christopher	1,060	41.2	+30.2
Reform	Gareth Shields	668	26.0	N/A
Labour	Rossane Kirk	436	16.9	−22.3
Conservative	Victoria Brooks	284	11.0	−29
Green	Seamus Murray	115	4.5	−5.4
Majority		392	15.2	+14.4
Turnout		2,574	32.0	+1.4
Registered electors		8,038		
Liberal Democrats gain from Conservative		Swing		

Swallow Beck & Witham
Party	Candidate	Votes	%	±%
Reform	Liam Kelly	1,091	37.9	+36.0
Conservative	Hilton Spratt	943	32.7	−26.6
Labour	Kate Marnoch	466	16.2	−12.1
Green	Sally Horscroft	199	6.9	+0.4
Liberal Democrats	Sharon Osborne	181	6.3	+2.3
Majority		148	5.2	−25.8
Turnout		2,697	33.6	−1.1
Registered electors		8,025		
Reform gain from Conservative		Swing		

=== East Lindsey ===
Alford & Sutton
Party	Candidate	Votes	%	±%
Reform	Mike Beecham	1,527	49.1	N/A
Green	Robert Watson	836	26.9	N/A
Conservative	Colin Matthews	543	17.5	−51.9
Labour	Ed Green	135	4.3	−14.8
Liberal Democrats	Mark Binns	68	2.2	N/A
Majority		691	22.2	−28.1
Turnout		3,120	40.0	+6.0
Registered electors		7,798		
Reform gain from Conservative		Swing		

Horncastle & the Keals
Party	Candidate	Votes	%	±%
Reform	Philip Roberts	1,407	44.6	N/A
Conservative	William Gray	1,092	34.6	−15.5
Labour	Peter Jouvenal	334	10.6	−13.9
Liberal Democrats	Steven Simons	325	10.3	N/A
Majority		315	10.0	−15.6
Turnout		3,177	34.5	+2.4
Registered electors		9,220		
Reform gain from Conservative		Swing		

Ingoldmells Rural
Party	Candidate	Votes	%	±%
Reform	Danny Brookes	1,704	60.6	N/A
Conservative	Colin Davie	784	27.9	−39.2
Labour	Alison McIntyre	179	6.4	−7.5
Liberal Democrats	David Tucker	144	5.1	N/A
Majority		920	32.7	−20.5
Turnout		2,837	36.9	+4.8
Registered electors		7,688		
Reform gain from Conservative		Swing		

Louth North
Party	Candidate	Votes	%	±%
Reform	Nick Hastings	1,070	38.5	N/A
Independent	Andrew Leonard	703	25.5	−9.8
Conservative	Alex Hall	552	19.9	−22.6
Labour	Claire Arnold	355	12.1	−10.1
Liberal Democrats	Ian Scard	112	4.0	N/A
Majority		367	13.0	+5.8
Turnout		2,802	32.7	−2.8
Registered electors		8,575		
Reform gain from Conservative		Swing		

Louth South
Party	Candidate	Votes	%	±%
Reform	Thomas Catton	932	34.4	N/A
Independent	Jill Mackinson-Sanders	876	32.3	+3.0
Labour	Ros Jackson	374	13.8	−3.0
Conservative	Abram Marfleet	330	12.2	−6.9
Green	Adam Bebbington	132	4.9	N/A
Liberal Democrats	Alex Beeby	66	2.4	N/A
Majority		56	2.1	0.0
Turnout		2,724	33.4	−2.1
Registered electors		8,145		
Reform gain from Independent		Swing		

Louth Wolds
Party	Candidate	Votes	%	±%
Reform	Alex McGonigle	1,461	41.7	N/A
Conservative	Hugo Marfleet	1,024	29.2	−38.6
Independent	Daniel Simpson	399	11.4	−0.4
Labour	Robert Bushell	285	8.1	−12.3
Green	Paul Fisher	176	5.0	N/A
Liberal Democrats	Carole Lebrun	147	4.2	N/A
SDP	Christopher Stevenson	12	0.3	N/A
Majority		437	12.5	−34.9
Turnout		3,530	40.4	+3.3
Registered electors		8,741		
Reform gain from Conservative		Swing		

Mablethorpe
Party	Candidate	Votes	%	±%
Reform	Ruben Robinson	1,543	52.8	N/A
Conservative	Noi Sear	599	20.5	−33.3
Labour	Graham Cullen	588	20.1	−26.1
Independent	George Horton	101	3.5	N/A
Liberal Democrats	Philip Culmer	93	3.2	N/A
Majority		944	32.3	+29.9
Turnout		2,930	37.5	+2.8
Registered electors		7,810		
Reform gain from Conservative		Swing		

Saltfleet & the Cotes
Party	Candidate	Votes	%	±%
Reform	Bayleigh Robinson	1,453	47.0	N/A
Conservative	Daniel McNally	822	26.6	−43.6
Independent	Travis Hesketh	484	15.6	N/A
Labour	Elizabeth Foreman	234	7.6	−6.2
Liberal Democrats	David Smalley	100	3.2	N/A
Majority		631	20.4	−33.8
Turnout		3,101	39.0	+7.0
Registered electors		7,952		
Reform gain from Conservative		Swing		

Skegness North
Party	Candidate	Votes	%	±%
Reform	Adrian Findley	1,502	62.7	N/A
Conservative	Carl Macey	652	27.2	−28.5
Labour	Emily Wood	158	6.6	−9.6
Liberal Democrats	James Plastow	85	3.5	N/A
Majority		850	35.5	+7.9
Turnout		2,406	27.1	+2.4
Registered electors		8,870		
Reform gain from Conservative		Swing		

Skegness South
Party	Candidate	Votes	%	±%
Reform	Jimmy Brookes	1,493	58.3	N/A
Conservative	Steve O'Dare	569	22.2	−30.6
Independent	Paul Collins	255	10.0	N/A
Labour	David Hall	172	6.7	−5.4
Liberal Democrats	Tony Fielding-Raby	71	2.8	N/A
Majority		924	36.1	+18.3
Turnout		2,573	29.6	+1.3
Registered electors		8,689		
Reform gain from Conservative		Swing		

Tattershall Castle
Party	Candidate	Votes	%	±%
Reform	Sean Matthews	1,472	46.6	N/A
Conservative	Tom Ashton	1,317	41.7	−38.9
Labour	Lin Sadler	188	5.9	−5.1
Liberal Democrats	Caroline Wills-Wright	152	4.8	N/A
Blue Revolution	Tristan Gilbert	33	1.0	N/A
Majority		155	4.9	−64.7
Turnout		3,177	35.3	+6.1
Registered electors		9,001		
Reform gain from Conservative		Swing		

Wainfleet
Party	Candidate	Votes	%	±%
Reform	Maria Hume	1,695	51.6	N/A
Conservative	Wendy Bowkett	1,169	35.6	−33.1
Labour	Max Gibson	225	6.8	−7.0
Liberal Democrats	Alice Lee	199	6.1	N/A
Majority		526	16.0	−38.9
Turnout		3,304	35.2	+4.9
Registered electors		9,381		
Reform gain from Conservative		Swing		

Woodhall Spa & Wragby
Party	Candidate	Votes	%	±%
Reform	Natalie Oliver	1,565	41.3	N/A
Conservative	Patricia Bradwell	1184	31.3	−45.2
Lincolnshire Independent	Ru Yarsley	507	13.7	N/A
Labour	Gary Hewson	300	7.9	−49.8
Liberal Democrats	Ross Pepper	219	5.8	N/A
Majority		381	10.0	−52.6
Turnout		3,793	42.8	+5.2
Registered electors		8,857		
Reform gain from Conservative		Swing		

=== South Holland ===
Crowland
Party	Candidate	Votes	%	±%
Reform	Raymond Condell	1,563	51.2	N/A
Conservative	Andrew Woolf	972	31.8	−46.3
Labour	Patrick Vaughan	185	6.1	N/A
Liberal Democrats	Lisa Brewin	171	5.6	N/A
Green	Charlie Poulter	164	5.4	N/A
Majority		591	19.4	−36.8
Turnout		3,067	30.8	+0.5
Registered electors		9,967		
Reform gain from Conservative		Swing		

Donington Rural
Party	Candidate	Votes	%	±%
Reform	Jane King	1,368	53.9	N/A
Conservative	Henry Bingham	770	30.3	−13.8
Green	Wendy Blackman	147	5.8	−0.6
Liberal Democrats	Neil Oakman	145	5.7	N/A
Labour	Leslie Burke	110	4.3	N/A
Majority		598	23.6	+18.2
Turnout		2,556	32.9	+3.7
Registered electors		7,774		
Reform gain from SH Independents		Swing		

Holbeach
Party	Candidate	Votes	%	±%
Reform	Thomas Sneath	1,338	56.0	N/A
Conservative	Clive Turner	626	26.2	−47.2
Green	Janet Dutton	167	7.0	N/A
Labour	Mike Horder	158	6.6	−2.1
Liberal Democrats	Seb Hague	100	4.2	N/A
Majority		712	29.8	−25.8
Turnout		2,406	27.7	+0.3
Registered electors		8,678		
Reform gain from Conservative		Swing		

Holbeach Rural
Party	Candidate	Votes	%	±%
Reform	Neil Carey	1,347	45.6	N/A
Conservative	Peter Coupland	976	33.1	−40.4
SH Independents	Paul Barnes	414	14.0	N/A
Labour	Safir Hussain	136	4.6	N/A
Liberal Democrats	Stephen Blogg	78	2.6	N/A
Majority		371	12.5	−45.6
Turnout		2,963	33.4	+3.4
Registered electors		8,879		
Reform gain from Conservative		Swing		

Spalding East
Party	Candidate	Votes	%	±%
Reform	Robert Gibson	1,238	51.3	N/A
Conservative	Anthony Casson	846	35.0	−14.1
Labour	James Thomas	176	7.3	N/A
Liberal Democrats	Liz Clews	155	6.4	N/A
Majority		392	16.3	+16.1
Turnout		2,434	30.9	+4.9
Registered electors		7,873		
Reform gain from SH Independents		Swing		

Spalding Elloe
Party	Candidate	Votes	%	±%
Reform	Ingrid Sheard	1,084	46.8	N/A
Conservative	Elizabeth Sneath	853	36.8	−30.2
Green	Martin Blake	172	7.4	−3.4
Labour	Rebecca Longbottom	146	6.3	−2.6
Liberal Democrats	Jim Snee	61	2.6	N/A
Majority		231	10.0	−43.7
Turnout		2,326	30.6	+4.1
Registered electors		7,612		
Reform gain from Conservative		Swing		

Spalding South
Party	Candidate	Votes	%	±%
Conservative	Gary Taylor	673	33.3	−13.0
Reform	Phil Webb	639	31.6	N/A
SH Independents	James Le Sage	434	21.4	−17.5
Labour	Lesley Allinson	155	7.7	−2.0
Green	Stephen Welton	69	3.4	−1.7
Liberal Democrats	Karen Carless	54	2.7	N/A
Majority		34	1.7	−5.7
Turnout		2,035	26.3	−1.3
Registered electors		7,746		
Conservative hold		Swing		

Spalding West
Party	Candidate	Votes	%	±%
Reform	Manzur Hasan	863	42.9	N/A
Conservative	Janet Whitbourn	774	38.5	+19.2
Labour	Stephen Follett	159	7.9	N/A
Green	Heather Violett	131	6.5	N/A
Liberal Democrats	Neil Taylor	85	4.2	N/A
Majority		89	4.4	−57.0
Turnout		2,022	25.8	+0.2
Registered electors		7,827		
Reform gain from SH Independents		Swing		

The Suttons
Party	Candidate	Votes	%	±%
Reform	Robbie Woods	886	40.0	N/A
Conservative	Jack Tyrrell	617	27.9	−26.9
SH Independents	Chris Brewis	605	27.3	−17.9
Liberal Democrats	Ray Southam	106	4.8	N/A
Majority		269	12.1	+2.5
Turnout		2,232	29.7	−0.3
Registered electors		7,504		
Reform gain from Conservative		Swing		

=== North Kesteven ===
Bassingham & Welbourn
Party	Candidate	Votes	%	±%
Lincolnshire Independent	Marianne Overton	1,672	45.9	−9.5
Reform	Laura MacGregor	1,005	28.3	N/A
Conservative	Clio Perraton-Williams	407	11.5	−23.4
Labour	Callum Goodge	279	7.9	−1.8
Green	Electra Pearce Roccio	145	4.1	N/A
Liberal Democrats	Sammy Parzal	84	2.4	N/A
Majority		667	17.6	−2.9
Turnout		3,601	36.6	+1.4
Registered electors		9,848		
Lincolnshire Independent hold		Swing		

Eagle & Hykeham West
Party	Candidate	Votes	%	±%
Reform	Alan Woodruff	1,069	42.4	N/A
Conservative	Alan Briggs	699	27.7	−36.1
Labour	Janet Hutchinson	419	16.6	+2.2
Liberal Democrats	Tony Richardson	335	13.3	+7.8
Majority		370	14.7	−32.8
Turnout		2,549	29.7	+0.1
Registered electors		8,591		
Reform gain from Conservative		Swing		

Heckington
Party	Candidate	Votes	%	±%
Reform	David East	1,506	45.1	N/A
Conservative	Christine Collard	867	26.0	−55.5
Lincolnshire Independent	Ann Mear	351	10.5	N/A
Liberal Democrats	Adrian Whittle	342	10.2	N/A
Labour	Jacky Scott-Combes	275	8.2	−10.3
Majority		639	19.1	−43.9
Turnout		3,353	35.2	+1.7
Registered electors		9,527		
Reform gain from Conservative		Swing		

Hykeham Forum
Party	Candidate	Votes	%	±%
Conservative	Stephen Roe	899	36.2	−36.4
Reform	Sam Wigley	827	33.3	N/A
Labour	Matthew Lofts	473	19.0	−8.4
Liberal Democrats	Corrine Bryon	149	6.0	N/A
Green	Lynda Skipper	112	4.5	N/A
UKIP	Michael Houldridge	24	1.0	N/A
Majority		72	2.9	−42.3
Turnout		2,494	32.3	+3.8
Registered electors		7,731		
Conservative hold		Swing		

Metheringham Rural
Party	Candidate	Votes	%	±%
Conservative	Rob Kendrick	1,144	42.8	−19.9
Reform	Jonathan Noble	985	36.9	N/A
Labour	Rachael Sylvester	266	10.0	−3.9
Liberal Democrats	Mark Bearder	167	6.3	N/A
Independent	Shona Russell	108	4.0	N/A
Majority		159	5.9	−33.4
Turnout		2,690	34.8	+2.1
Registered electors		7,726		
Conservative hold		Swing		

Potterhanworth & Coleby
Party	Candidate	Votes	%	±%
Conservative	Ian Carrington	1,055	34.5	−15.9
Reform	Brian Lumb	1,039	34.0	N/A
Liberal Democrats	Stephen Chapman	379	12.4	+8.2
Green	John Howson	322	10.5	N/A
Independent	Hope Morgan	259	8.5	N/A
Majority		16	0.5	−18.9
Turnout		3,072	35.5	−0.2
Registered electors		8,651		
Conservative hold		Swing		

Ruskington
Party	Candidate	Votes	%	±%
Conservative	Richard Wright	1,087	38.2	−41.5
Reform	Dave Conway	1,079	38.0	N/A
Labour	Sheila Goodall	240	8.4	−11.9
Liberal Democrats	Jonny Hoare	230	8.1	N/A
Lincolnshire Independent	Ken Fernandes	206	7.2	N/A
Majority		8	0.2	−59.2
Turnout		2,856	34.1	+0.6
Registered electors		8,375		
Conservative hold		Swing		

Sleaford
Party	Candidate	Votes	%	±%
Reform	Steve Clegg	961	40.5	N/A
Lincolnshire Independent	David Suiter	403	17.0	N/A
Labour	Linda Edwards-Shea	398	16.8	−3.6
Conservative	Mark Smith	347	14.6	−31.0
Independent	Anthony Brand	132	5.6	N/A
Liberal Democrats	Susan Hislop	132	5.6	+1.1
Majority		558	23.5	−1.7
Turnout		2,389	26.9	+0.4
Registered electors		8,886		
Reform gain from Conservative		Swing		

Sleaford Rural
Party	Candidate	Votes	%	±%
Reform	Ray Whitaker	872	33.6	N/A
Conservative	Andrew Hagues	694	26.7	−28.7
Lincolnshire Independent	Dave Darmon	404	15.5	+0.3
Liberal Democrats	Darnley Rayside	182	7.0	+2.5
Labour	Mick Goodall	180	6.9	−3.8
Green	Mark Sharpe	134	5.2	N/A
Independent	Steve Mason	133	5.1	−9.1
Majority		178	6.9	−33.3
Turnout		2,602	31.3	−0.6
Registered electors		8,320		
Reform gain from Conservative		Swing		

Waddington & Hykeham East
Party	Candidate	Votes	%	±%
Conservative	Thomas Dyer	1,276	48.6	−15.3
Reform	Mark Nind	850	32.4	N/A
Liberal Democrats	Olly Craven	251	9.6	+3.3
Green	Jim Barling	247	9.4	N/A
Majority		426	16.2	−30.1
Turnout		2,632	30.9	+2.7
Registered electors		8,522		
Conservative hold		Swing		

Washingborough
Party	Candidate	Votes	%	±%
Conservative	Lindsey Cawrey	1,002	39.0	−26.5
Reform	Nikki Dillon	872	34.0	N/A
Labour	Funmi Adeyemi	333	13.0	+0.1
Liberal Democrats	Peter Harrison	193	7.5	+4.0
Green	Christopher Rattigan-Smith	167	6.5	−1.3
Majority		130	5.0	−47.6
Turnout		2,571	32.1	+0.3
Registered electors		8,015		
Conservative hold		Swing		

=== South Kesteven ===
Bourne North & Morton
Party	Candidate	Votes	%	±%
Conservative	Sue Woolley*	1,261	52.0	−25.8
Reform	Alan Jack	692	28.6	N/A
Liberal Democrats	Rhea Rayside	286	11.8	N/A
Labour	Umesh Pathak	184	7.6	−14.6
Majority		569	23.4	
Turnout		2,434	35.3	−0.5
Registered electors		6,890		
Conservative hold		Swing		

Bourne South & Thurlby
Party	Candidate	Votes	%	±%
Reform	Ken Redfern	875	30.3	N/A
Conservative	Jonathan Brough	837	29.0	−41.2
Lincolnshire Independent	Nigel Eveleigh	293	10.2	N/A
Independent	Barry Dobson	246	8.5	N/A
Green	Emma Baker	237	8.2	N/A
Labour	Jude Davies	226	7.8	−22.0
Liberal Democrats	John Ireland	172	6.0	N/A
Majority		38	1.3	
Turnout		2,900	27.5	−1.0
Registered electors		10,545		
Reform gain from Conservative		Swing		

Colsterworth Rural
Party	Candidate	Votes	%	±%
Conservative	Charlotte Vernon	1,018	42.2	−34.6
Reform	Angie Jamison	778	32.3	N/A
Labour	Patricia Casement-Thomas	220	9.1	−14.1
Green	Michael Brooman	172	7.1	N/A
Liberal Democrats	Josh Connor	115	4.8	N/A
Independent	John Morgan	109	4.5	N/A
Majority		240	9.9	
Turnout		2,421	33.3	−2.6
Registered electors		7,280		
Conservative hold		Swing		

Deepings East
Party	Candidate	Votes	%	±%
Independent	Phil Dilks*	1,019	40.5	−25.5
Reform	Emily Bates	795	31.6	N/A
Conservative	Tony Vaughan	405	16.1	−17.9
Labour	Keith Batty	153	6.1	N/A
Liberal Democrats	Anna Wotherspoon	142	5.6	N/A
Majority		224	8.9	
Turnout		2,527	31.0	−3.2
Registered electors		8,161		
Independent hold		Swing		

Deepings West & Rural
Party	Candidate	Votes	%	±%
Independent	Ashley Baxter*	926	35.1	−21.2
Reform	William Mason	831	31.5	N/A
Conservative	Christopher Benn	611	23.2	−20.5
Labour	Matthew Mahabadi	200	7.6	N/A
Homeland	Andrew Piper	67	2.5	N/A
Majority		95	3.6	
Turnout		2,644	33.2	−2.6
Registered electors		7,962		
Independent hold		Swing		

Folkingham Rural
Party	Candidate	Votes	%	±%
Conservative	Martin Hill*	1,282	40.6	−18.5
Reform	Mike Rudkin	1,098	34.8	N/A
Liberal Democrats	Murray Turner	430	13.6	N/A
Labour	Alexander Kirk	296	9.4	−4.9
SDP	Alexander Mitchell	50	1.6	N/A
Majority		184	5.8	
Turnout		3,170	40.4	
Registered electors		7,847		
Conservative hold		Swing		

Grantham Barrowby
Party	Candidate	Votes	%	±%
Reform	Richard Litchfield	930	39.9	N/A
Conservative	Mark Whittington*	746	32.0	−31.1
Labour Co-op	Lee Steptoe	318	13.6	−14.6
Independent	Paul Woolmer	138	5.9	N/A
Green	Brynley Heaven	128	5.5	−3.2
Liberal Democrats	Joanne Whelan	70	3.0	N/A
Majority		184	7.9	
Turnout		2,340	28.2	
Registered electors		8,310		
Reform gain from Conservative		Swing		

Grantham East
Party	Candidate	Votes	%	±%
Reform	Cain Parkinson	670	34.9	N/A
Independent	Ian Selby	524	27.3	+1.1
Conservative	Mary Whittington	260	13.5	−31.9
Independent	Linda Wootten*	192	10.0	−35.4
Labour	David Burling	175	9.1	−9.3
Green	Vidmantas Dusevicius	99	5.2	N/A
Majority		146	7.6	
Turnout		1,925	27.2	
Registered electors		7,080		
Reform gain from Conservative		Swing		

Grantham North
Party	Candidate	Votes	%	±%
Conservative	Paul Martin	980	36.0	−34.8
Reform	Dan Kirk	901	33.1	N/A
Labour	Joseph Archer	307	11.3	−6.2
Independent	Wayne Hasnip	219	8.0	−9.5
Liberal Democrats	James Osborn	177	6.5	N/A
Green	Claire Hainstock	141	5.2	−6.5
Majority		79	2.9	
Turnout		2,735	33.2	
Registered electors		8,228		
Conservative hold		Swing		

Grantham South
Party	Candidate	Votes	%	±%
Reform	Carl Edgoose-Zagorskiy	575	30.0	N/A
Independent	Charmaine Morgan	491	25.6	N/A
Conservative	Adam Stokes*	400	20.9	−23.8
Labour	Tracey Forman	212	11.1	−21.2
Green	Anne Gayfer	135	7.0	−8.7
Liberal Democrats	Paul Osei	104	5.4	N/A
Majority		84	4.4	
Turnout		1,927	30.1	
Registered electors		8,075		
Reform gain from Conservative		Swing		

Grantham West
Party	Candidate	Votes	%	±%
Conservative	Richard Davies*	788	43.4	−19.7
Reform	Kyle Abel	546	30.0	N/A
Labour Co-op	Rob Shorrock	255	14.0	−12.2
Independent	Elvis Stooke	125	6.9	N/A
Green	Gerhard Lohmann-Bond	103	5.7	−5.0
Majority		242	13.4	
Turnout		2,387	28.8	
Registered electors		6,066		
Conservative hold		Swing		

Hough
Party	Candidate	Votes	%	±%
Reform	Ken Bamford	1,068	33.7	N/A
Conservative	Ben Green	879	27.7	−30.7
Independent	Paul Wood	780	24.6	−5.9
Liberal Democrats	Andrew Craven	179	5.6	N/A
Green	Jenny Griffin	138	4.4	N/A
Labour	Gill Thornton	125	3.9	−7.2
Majority		189	6.0	
Turnout		3,267	40.0	
Registered electors		8,165		
Reform gain from Conservative		Swing		

Stamford East
Party	Candidate	Votes	%	±%
Conservative	Kelham Cooke*	651	29.1	−17.8
Liberal Democrats	Harrish Bisnauthsing	521	23.3	−10.9
Reform	Jack Cranson	489	21.8	N/A
Labour	Robin Lister	248	11.1	−7.8
Independent	Pam Byrd	226	10.1	N/A
Independent	Angela Carter-Begbie	103	4.6	N/A
Majority		130	5.8	
Turnout		2,248	28.2	
Registered electors		7,969		
Conservative hold		Swing		

Stamford West
Party	Candidate	Votes	%	±%
Independent	Richard Cleaver*	1,279	51.3	+3.3
Conservative	Stefan Calvert	497	19.9	−11.1
Reform	Michelle Seal	439	17.6	N/A
Labour	Samantha Hammond	164	6.6	−3.3
Liberal Democrats	Habib Rahman	115	4.6	N/A
Majority		782	31.4	
Turnout		2,498	32.7	
Registered electors		7,638		
Independent hold		Swing		

=== West Lindsey ===
Bardney & Cherry Willingham
Party	Candidate	Votes	%	±%
Reform	Trevor Bridgwood	1,350	42.5	+40.6
Conservative	Ian Fleetwood*	1,022	32.1	−29.6
Labour	Duncan Spencer	369	11.6	−2.3
Liberal Democrats	Vicky Pearson	272	8.6	N/A
Lincolnshire Independent	Paul Key	166	5.2	−17.2
Majority		328	10.4	−39.3
Turnout		3,195	36.8	+3.2
Registered electors		8,668		
Reform gain from Conservative		Swing		

Gainsborough Hill
Party	Candidate	Votes	%	±%
Liberal Democrats	Matt Boles*	632	39.5	−21.7
Reform	Pat O'Connor	625	39.1	+32.1
Conservative	Olayide Olumeko	146	9.1	−12.2
Lincolnshire Independent	Nick Coxon	76	4.8	N/A
Labour	Colin Saywell	67	4.2	−6.3
Green	Alex-Rhys Jenkins	52	3.3	N/A
Majority		7	0.4	−39.5
Turnout		1,608	22.0	+1.0
Registered electors		7,309		
Liberal Democrats hold		Swing		

Gainsborough Rural South
Party	Candidate	Votes	%	±%
Reform	Paul Wimhurst	1,288	39.0	N/A
Conservative	Richard Butroid*	1,147	34.7	−31.3
Liberal Democrats	Rob Wall	424	12.8	+3.6
Labour	Giles Sullivan	413	12.5	−4.6
Libertarian	Jon Gregory	30	0.9	N/A
Majority		141	4.3	−44.6
Turnout		3,323	39.4	+4.5
Registered electors		8,428		
Reform gain from Conservative		Swing		

Gainsborough Trent
Party	Candidate	Votes	%	±%
Liberal Democrats	Trevor Young*	709	39.3	−19.6
Reform	Matthew Palmer	690	38.2	N/A
Labour	Harry Eddowes	159	8.8	±0.0
Independent	Richard Craig	128	7.1	N/A
Conservative	Glen Thompson	118	6.5	−6.9
Majority		19	1.1	−38.8
Turnout		1,819	24.2	−0.9
Registered electors		7,530		
Liberal Democrats hold		Swing		

Market Rasen Wolds
Party	Candidate	Votes	%	±%
Liberal Democrats	Stephen Bunney*	1,626	46.1	+0.4
Reform	Martin Smith	1,030	29.2	N/A
Conservative	Peter Morris	636	18.0	−27.2
Labour	Brian Jones	151	4.3	−4.8
Green	Christopher Horne	81	2.3	N/A
Majority		596	16.9	+16.4
Turnout		3,541	38.5	+2.5
Registered electors		9,184		
Liberal Democrats hold		Swing		

Nettleham & Saxilby
Party	Candidate	Votes	%	±%
Conservative	Jackie Brockway*	1,566	47.4	−19.1
Reform	Josh Feasey	830	25.1	N/A
Labour	Terry McGuire	432	13.1	+2.2
Liberal Democrats	Lynda Mullally	249	7.5	−8.0
Green	Karen Hollis	206	6.2	−0.9
UKIP	Rikki Doolan	18	0.5	N/A
Majority		736	22.3	−28.7
Turnout		3,315	37.3	−0.1
Registered electors		8,898		
Conservative hold		Swing		

North Wolds
Party	Candidate	Votes	%	±%
Reform	James Bean	1,207	38.3	N/A
Conservative	Tom Smith*	1,139	36.2	−23.5
Liberal Democrats	William Bunney	321	10.2	−15.3
Labour	Cameron Marnoch	306	9.7	−5.1
Green	Barry Coward	176	5.6	N/A
Majority		68	2.1	−32.1
Turnout		3,155	36.5	+3.3
Registered electors		8,639		
Reform gain from Conservative		Swing		

Scotter Rural
Party	Candidate	Votes	%	±%
Reform	Christopher Reeve	1,308	42.9	N/A
Liberal Democrats	Lesley Rollings	910	29.8	−6.8
Conservative	Sheila Bibb	563	18.4	−20.5
Labour	Thomas Cox	165	5.4	−4.8
Green	Nigel Bowler	106	3.5	N/A
Majority		398	13.1	+10.8
Turnout		3,065	37.1	+3.9
Registered electors		8,250		
Reform gain from Conservative		Swing		

Welton Rural
Party	Candidate	Votes	%	±%
Reform	Jane Smith	1,165	35.3	N/A
Conservative	Tracey Coulson	830	25.2	−30.8
Liberal Democrats	Paul Swift	815	24.7	+17.4
Labour	Calum Watt	486	14.7	+0.2
Majority		335	10.1	−23.7
Turnout		3,327	35.1	+0.1
Registered electors		9,486		
Reform gain from Conservative		Swing		

== See also ==
- Lincolnshire County Council elections
