= Witham Way Country Park =

Park in Boston, Lincolnshire, England

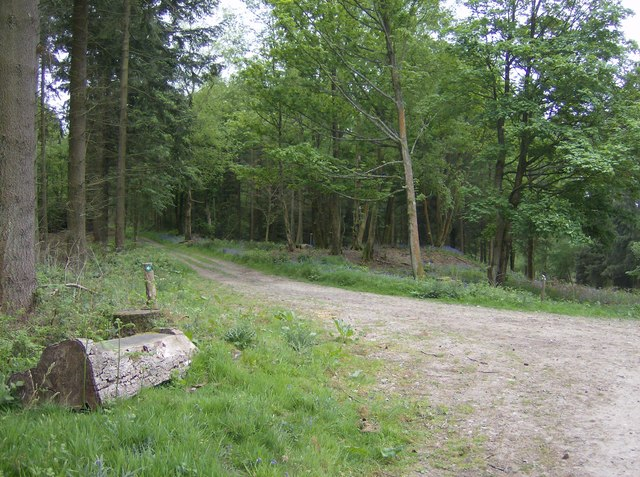
- Interactive map of Witham Way Country Park
- Type: Country park
- Coordinates: 52°59′24″N 0°02′19″W
- Area: 38 acres (15 ha)
- Operator: Boston Borough Council
- Open: All year

Witham Way Country Park is a country park in Boston, Lincolnshire, England.

== Facilities ==
There is walking, cycling, horse riding, children's play areas, fishing, camping, bird watching, outdoor sports, a picnic area, an orchard and the River Witham passes through the park. The park is adjacent to Boston Town F. C. A Parkrun takes place every Saturday starting at 9 am.

== Nature ==
The country park is a Local Nature Reserve and offers the local wildlife several habitats including woodland, grassland and scrub. A wildflower meadow attracts bees and there is a bug park attracting insects, butterflies and bees. Owls are nesting in bird boxes that have been sited.
