= Hubberts Bridge =

Village in the borough of Boston, Lincolnshire, England

Coordinates: 52.973375°N 0.113210°W

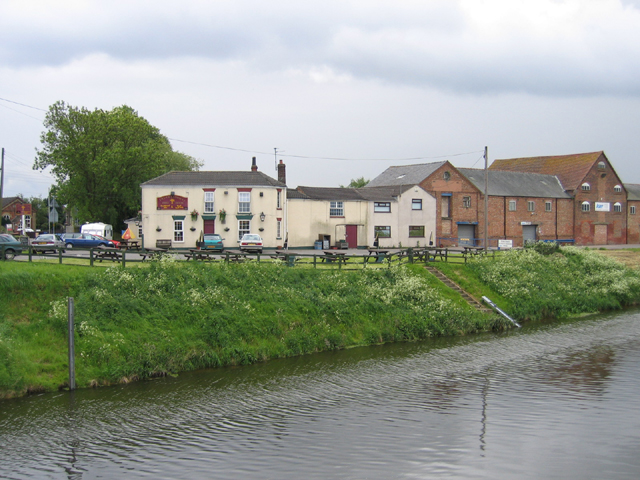
- The Wheatsheaf Inn, Hubberts Bridge

- Location within Lincolnshire
- OS grid reference: TF267434
  - London: 100 mi (160 km) S
- Civil parish: Frampton
- District: Boston
- Shire county: Lincolnshire
- Region: East Midlands
- Country: England
- Sovereign state: United Kingdom
- Post town: Boston
- Postcode district: PE20
- Police: Lincolnshire
- Fire: Lincolnshire
- Ambulance: East Midlands
- UK Parliament: Boston and Skegness

Hubberts Bridge is a village in the borough of Boston, Lincolnshire, England. It is situated within the civil parish of Frampton, and approximately 3 miles (5 km) west from Boston.

The village name derives from the bridge crossing the South Forty-Foot Drain. Originally it was a wooden structure, thought to have been owned by Robert Hubbert, born on the 2 March in Lincolnshire and died in 1850 in Boston, Lincolnshire. A new wooden bridge was erected about 1850, but was replaced again by a brick structure in 1888 by the county justices for the Parts of Holland from designs of John Kingston, county surveyor.

The village is served by Hubberts Bridge railway station, and has a local public house, the Wheatsheaf Inn, and a community centre.
