= RSPB Frampton Marsh =

RSPB nature reserve in Lincolnshire, England

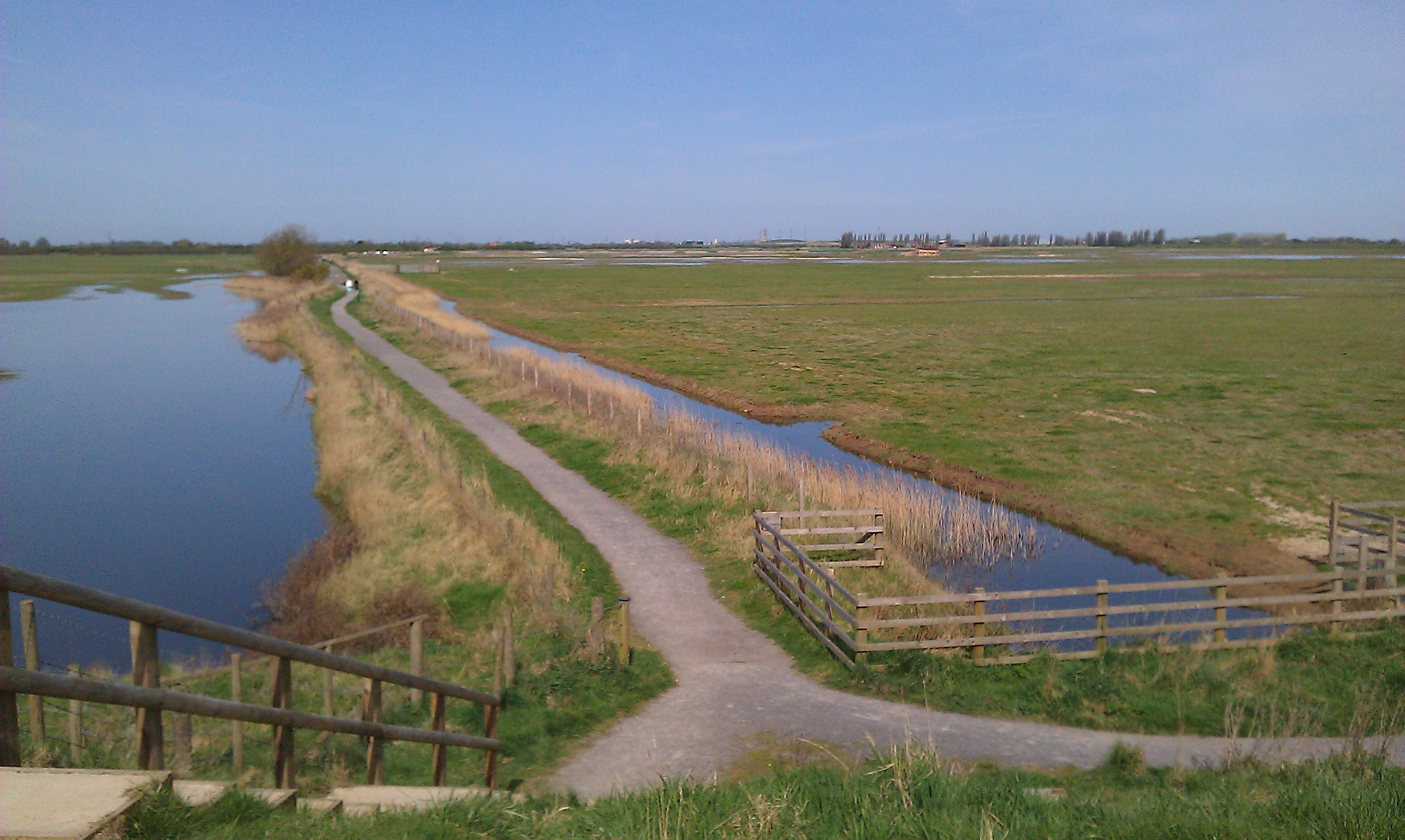

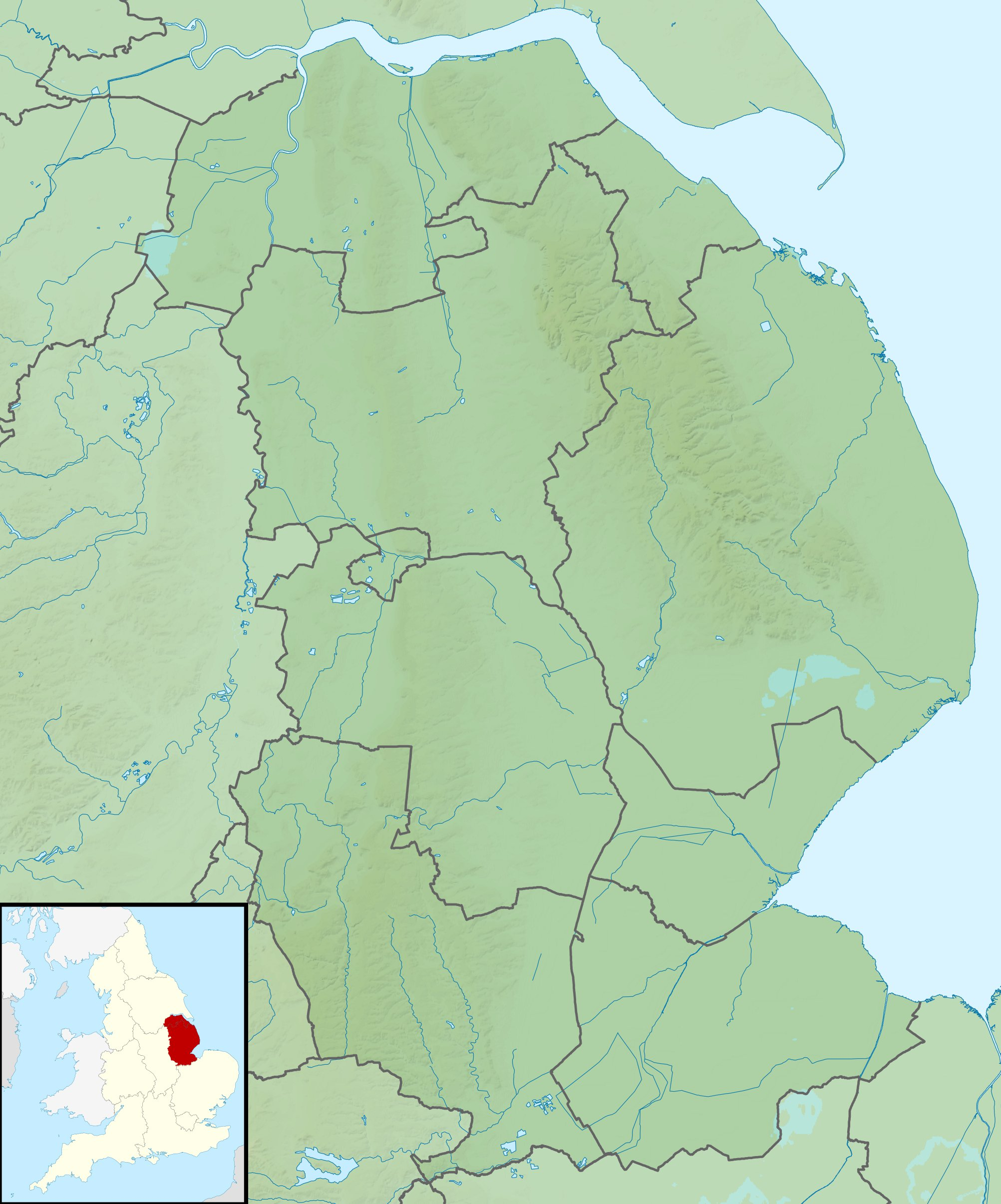
- Location within Lincolnshire
- Location: Frampton, Lincolnshire, England
- Coordinates: 52.9263°N 0.0266°E
- Area: 172 hectares (430 acres)
- Operator: RSPB; Lincolnshire Wildlife Trust
- Website: www.rspb.org.uk/days-out/reserves/frampton-marsh

Frampton Marsh is a nature reserve in Lincolnshire, England. The reserve is situated on the coast of The Wash, 4 miles from the town of Boston, between the outfalls of the Rivers Welland and Witham (covering an area of mature salt marsh known as The Scalp), and near the village of Frampton in an area known as the “Fosdyke Wash”. The majority of the reserve is managed by the RSPB with a small part of the saltmarsh managed by the Lincolnshire Wildlife Trust. There is a visitor centre with an adjacent cafe at the entrance to the reserve.

== History ==
The majority of the site was purchased by the RSPB in 1984, but it was not until 2007, when arable farmland inland of the sea bank was purchased, that the wetland creation project began.

== Fauna and flora ==
=== Birds ===
Thousands of migrating birds gather at Frampton Marsh. Species which can be regularly observed here include pied avocet, common redshank and Eurasian curlew. The reserve frequently sees nationally rare bird species appear, the majority of which are rare waders. These have included a black-winged stilt, broad-billed sandpiper and Wilson's phalarope during 2015 and a lesser yellowlegs during 2014. The site was also the location of the first nesting attempt by a glossy ibis in the UK.
