= 2023 Boston Borough Council election =

2023 English local election

- May 4, 2023

All 30 seats on Boston Borough Council 16 seats needed for a majority
	First party	Second party	Third party
	BI	CON	IND
Leader	Anne Dorrian	Paul Skinner	N/A
Party	Boston Independent	Conservative	Independent
Leader's seat	Skirbeck	Fishtoft (lost seat)
Last election	Did not exist	16 seats, 45.0%	11 seats, 28.1%
Seats before	0	15 (Note: Including one vacant seat at Swineshead and Holland Fen previously held by Conservative councillor Chelcei Sharman prior to her resignation in November 2022.)	13 (Note: Of the 13 independent councillors before the election, 4 sat as the "Independent 20/20" group, led by Peter Watson (who stood as a Liberal Democrat in 2023), 4 sat as the "Welbourn, Howard and Austin Independents", led by Judith Welbourn, and the other 5 did not belong to any group.)
Seats after	18	5	5
Seat change	▲18	▼11	▼6
Popular vote	6,208	4,256	2,353
Percentage	41.0%	28.1%	15.5%
Swing	New Party	▼16.9 pp	▼12.6 pp
	Fourth party	Fifth party	Sixth party
	BR	LDM	LAB
Party	Blue Revolution	Liberal Democrats	Labour
Last election	0 seats, 1.9%	0 seats, 0.4%	2 seats, 19.3%
Seats before	0	0	2
Seats after	1	1	0
Seat change	▲1	▲1	▼2
Popular vote	901	638	455
Percentage	5.9%	4.2%	3.0%
Swing	▲4.0 pp	▲3.8 pp	▼16.3 pp
- Results by ward
Leader before election
Paul Skinner
Conservative
No overall control
Leader after election
Anne Dorrian
Boston Independent

The 2023 Boston Borough Council election took place on 4 May, 2023, to elect all 30 members of Boston Borough Council in Lincolnshire, England.

Prior to the election the council was under no overall control, being led by a minority Conservative administration with support from some of the independent councillors. Following the results, the council became under the control of local party, Boston Independent, which had only been registered as a party in March 2023. The Conservative leader, Paul Skinner, lost his seat. Boston Independent leader, Anne Dorrian, was appointed as new leader of the council at the subsequent annual council meeting on 22 May 2023.

== Results summary ==
2023 Boston Borough Council election
Party	Seats	Gains	Losses	Net gain/loss	Seats %	Votes %	Votes	+/−
Boston Independent	18	18	0	▲18	60.0	41.0	6,208	
Conservative	5	0	11	▼11	16.7	28.1	4,256	
Independent	5	1	7	▼6	16.7	15.5	2,353	
Blue Revolution	1	1	0	▲1	3.3	5.9	901	
Liberal Democrats	1	1	0	▲1	3.3	4.2	638	
Labour	0	0	2	▼2	0.0	3.0	455	
Green	0	0	0	Steady	0.0	1.4	217	
English Democrat	0	0	0	Steady	0.0	0.5	75	
Reform	0	0	0	Steady	0.0	0.3	43	
UKIP	0	0	1	▼1	0.0	n/a	n/a	

== Ward results ==
The results for each ward were as follows, with an asterisk (*) indicating a sitting councillor standing for re-election:

=== Coastal ===
Coastal (2 seats)
Party	Candidate	Votes	%	±%
Boston Independent	Dale Broughton	605	64.2	+64.2
Independent	Peter Bedford*	388	41.1	−4.1
Independent	Judith Ann Welbourn*	326	34.6	+2.1
Conservative	Susan Anita Jane Blackburn	255	27.0	+3
Turnout		943	32.83	−1.07
Registered electors		2,897		
Boston Independent gain from Independent				
Independent hold				

=== Fenside ===
Fenside (2 seats)
Party	Candidate	Votes	%	±%
Boston Independent	Patricia Irene Lesley Marson	308	51.2	+51.2
Conservative	Anton Dani*	209	34.7	+2
Labour	Benjamin John Cook	196	32.6	+2.2
Independent	Patrisha Ann Wainwright	115	19.1	−12.4
Blue Revolution	Carol Julie Broomfield-Douglas	109	18.1	+2.4
Turnout		602	18.71	−3.69
Registered electors		3,229		
Boston Independent gain from Labour				
Conservative hold				

=== Fishtoft ===
Fishtoft (3 seats)
Party	Candidate	Votes	%	±%
Boston Independent	Helen Staples	952	61.6	+61.6
Boston Independent	Sarah Louise Sharpe	900	58.2	+58.2
Boston Independent	David Charles Scoot	800	51.7	+51.7
Conservative	Jonathan Howard Noble*	473	30.6	−16
Conservative	Judith Ann Skinner*	453	29.3	−29.9
Conservative	Paul Anthony Skinner*	397	25.7	−27.1
Green	Christopher Michael Moore	217	14.0	+14
Turnout		1,546	28.5	+2.2
Registered electors		5,450		
Boston Independent gain from Conservative				
Boston Independent gain from Conservative				
Boston Independent gain from Conservative				

=== Five Villages ===
Five Villages (2 seats)
Party	Candidate	Votes	%	±%
Conservative	James William Stephen Geoff Cantwell	453	53.9	+1.9
Conservative	David Andrew Brown*	446	53.1	+2.7
Boston Independent	George Raoul Joseph Reid	357	42.5	+42.5
Independent	Aaron Jacob Spencer*	257	30.6	+30.6
Turnout		840	27.01	−2.09
Registered electors		3,147		
Conservative hold				
Conservative hold				

David Brown represented Kirton and Frampton prior to the election. Aaron Spencer had been elected in 2019 as a Conservative but left the party in 2020 and sat as an independent for the remainder of his term, as did the other Conservative elected in 2019, Michael Cooper (who did not stand for re-election). Both seats shown as Conservative hold for comparison with 2019 election.

=== Kirton and Frampton ===
Kirton and Frampton (3 seats)
Party	Candidate	Votes	%	±%
Conservative	Claire Rebecca Rylott	511	38.0	−6.9
Liberal Democrats	Ralph Pryke	435	32.3	+32.3
Boston Independent	David Arthur Middleton	426	31.6	+31.6
Boston Independent	Munish Kumar	420	31.2	+31.2
Liberal Democrats	Peter Mark Falloon Watson*	420	31.2	+31.2
Conservative	Tracey Ann Abbott*	410	30.5	−9.7
Boston Independent	Deepa Agarwal	407	30.2	+30.2
Liberal Democrats	Lorraine Louise O'Connor	356	26.5	+26.5
Conservative	Lana MacLennan-James	352	26.2	+26.2
Turnout		1,344	24.95	−0.25
Registered electors		5,399		
Conservative hold				
Liberal Democrats gain from Independent				
Boston Independent gain from Conservative				

Tracey Abbott represented Wyberton prior to the election. Peter Watson had been an independent prior to the election but stood as a Liberal Democrat.

=== Old Leake and Wrangle ===
Old Leake and Wrangle (2 seats)
Party	Candidate	Votes	%	±%
Boston Independent	Callum Jake Butler	566	55.9	+55.9
Boston Independent	John Robert Baxter	471	46.5	+46.5
Conservative	Thomas R. Ashton*	296	29.2	−26.2
Conservative	Frank Harry Pickett*	127	12.5	−34.5
Independent	Russell Hill	85	8.4	+8.4
Independent	Michael James Litchfield	79	7.8	+7.8
English Democrat	David Dickason	75	7.4	+7.4
Reform	Marie Lisa Baxendale	43	4.2	+4.2
Turnout		1,013	35.85	+2.55
Registered electors		2,834		
Boston Independent gain from Conservative				
Boston Independent gain from Conservative				

=== Skirbeck ===
Skirbeck (3 seats)
Party	Candidate	Votes	%	±%
Boston Independent	Anne Monica Dorrian*	562	61.4	+61.4
Boston Independent	Neil John Drayton	501	54.7	+54.7
Independent	Paul Michael Gleeson	345	37.7	+37.7
Conservative	Katherine Marie Chalmers*	292	31.9	+3.8
Boston Independent	Dmitrij Kondratcik	264	28.8	+28.8
Liberal Democrats	Karolis Stasiukenas	120	13.1	+13.1
Turnout		916	18.35	−3.95
Registered electors		5,019		
Boston Independent gain from Independent				
Boston Independent gain from Independent				
Independent gain from Conservative				

Anne Dorrian had been an independent in 2019 but stood as a Boston Independent in 2023; seat shown as Boston Independent gain from independent to allow comparison with 2019.

=== St Thomas' ===
St Thomas'
Party	Candidate	Votes	%	±%
Independent	Alison Mary Austin*	235	52.9	−19.1
Boston Independent	Shafqat Bashir	146	32.9	+32.9
Independent	Darron Richard Abbott	38	8.6	−12.3
Labour	Andrew Barry Cook	25	5.6	−1.5
Turnout		444	24.6	−6.7
Registered electors		1,813		
Independent hold				

=== Staniland ===
Staniland (2 seats)
Party	Candidate	Votes	%	±%
Boston Independent	Barrie James Pierpoint	352	54.4	+54.4
Blue Revolution	Michael William Gilbert	263	40.6	+40.6
Conservative	Matthew Alan Barnes	230	35.5	+5.5
Conservative	Deborah Evans*	229	35.4	−3.8
Turnout		647	22.77	−3.43
Registered electors		2,855		
Boston Independent gain from Conservative				
Blue Revolution gain from Independent				

=== Station ===
Station
Party	Candidate	Votes	%	±%
Boston Independent	Lina Savickiene	98	37.4	+37.4
Blue Revolution	Gavin Stewart Lee	89	34.0	+9.8
Conservative	Adriaan Vickery	75	28.6	+12.4
Turnout		262	18.86	−3.94
Registered electors		1,405		
Boston Independent gain from Labour				

=== Swineshead and Holland Fen ===
Swineshead and Holland Fen (2 seats)
Party	Candidate	Votes	%	±%
Boston Independent	Suzanne Welberry	722	71.8	+71.8
Conservative	Stuart Russell Evans	474	47.1	−23.6
Labour	Tracy Ann Pomfret	234	23.3	−0.8
Blue Revolution	Tristan Thomas William Gilbert	114	11.3	+11.3
Turnout		1,006	30.12	+4.62
Registered electors		3,340		
Boston Independent gain from Conservative				
Conservative hold				

=== Trinity ===
Trinity (2 seats)
Party	Candidate	Votes	%	±%
Boston Independent	Emma Jayne Cresswell	460	50.5	+50.5
Boston Independent	Jyothi Arayambath	381	41.8	+41.8
Conservative	Yvonne Jennifer Stevens*	380	41.7	−5.2
Conservative	Martin Alexander Griggs*	343	37.7	−7.8
Blue Revolution	Christopher Dorrington	139	15.3	+15.3
Turnout		911	27.72	−0.08
Registered electors		3,286		
Boston Independent gain from Conservative				
Boston Independent gain from Conservative				

=== West ===
West
Party	Candidate	Votes	%	±%
Independent	Stephen Victor Woodliffe*	380	72.1	+27.8
Conservative	Paula Ashleigh-Morris	147	27.9	−6.9
Turnout		527	30.28	−3.22
Registered electors		1,747		
Independent hold				

=== Witham ===
Witham (2 seats)
Party	Candidate	Votes	%	±%
Boston Independent	Andrew Robert Izard	349	54.2	+54.2
Boston Independent	Sandeep Ghosh	276	42.9	+42.9
Conservative	Maria Elzbieta Dani	211	32.8	+4.9
Blue Revolution	Andrea Patricia Keal	114	17.7	+17.7
Independent	Neill John Hastie*	87	13.5	−23.8
Blue Revolution	Richard Thornalley	63	9.8	+9.8
Turnout		644	21.61	−3.49
Registered electors		3,022		
Boston Independent gain from Independent				
Boston Independent gain from UKIP				

=== Wyberton ===
Wyberton (2 seats)
Party	Candidate	Votes	%	±%
Independent	Richard William Austin*	423	47.1	−11.7
Boston Independent	Christopher Kenneth Mountain	305	34.0	+34
Boston Independent	Rachael Lynne Gibbons	268	29.8	+29.8
Conservative	Andrew Nicholas Jordan Elms	250	27.8	−6.2
Independent	Sue Ransome	183	20.4	−14
Liberal Democrats	Jason Stevenson	83	9.2	+9.2
Blue Revolution	Charlotte Louise Halderson	73	8.1	+8.1
Liberal Democrats	Sandra Janet Watson	66	7.3	+7.3
Turnout		898	24.13	−4.77
Registered electors		3,730		
Independent hold				
Boston Independent gain from Independent				

Second seat shown as Boston Independent gain from independent to allow comparison with 2019; the previous incumbent, Tracey Abbott, had been elected as an independent but later joined the Conservatives. She stood for re-election in Kirton and Frampton ward instead of Wyberton in 2023.

== Changes 2023–2027 ==
- On 11 July 2025, 14 of the 17 Boston Independent councillors, including deputy leader Dale Broughton and five other former portfolio holders and cabinet members, resigned from the party to sit as independents, forming a new group.
- On 21 July 2025, council leader Anne Dorrian was removed after the defection and was succeeded by Dale Broughton, leading the new Progressive Independents Boston group.

=== By-elections ===
==== Trinity ====
The by-election was triggered by the resignation of Boston Independent councillor Jyothi Arayambath.

Trinity by-election: 1 May 2025
Party	Candidate	Votes	%	±%
Reform	Jonathan Howard Noble	388	39.2	N/A
Boston Independent	Shafqat Bashir	277	28.0	N/A
Conservative	Katherine Marie Chalmers	237	24.0	N/A
Green	Jonathan Graeham Wolf	76	7.7	N/A
Blue Revolution	Richard Thornalley	11	1.1	N/A
Rejected ballots		4	0.4	
Turnout		993	30.0	N/A
Registered electors		3,305		
Reform gain from Boston Independent				
