= Municipal Buildings, Boston =

Municipal building in Boston, Lincolnshire, England

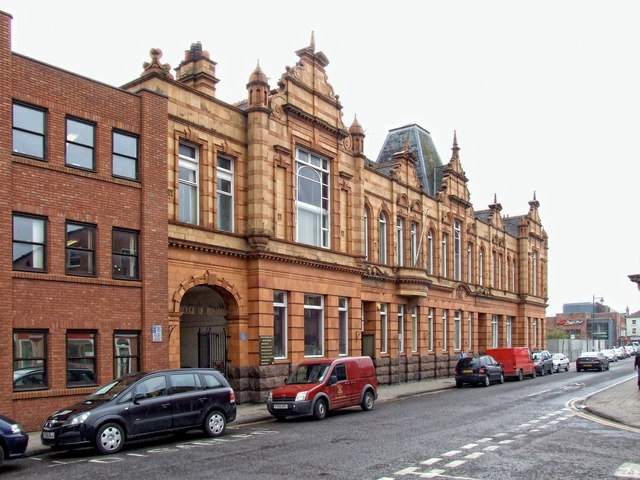
- The building in 2014

- Shown in Lincolnshire
- 52.9762°N 0.0272°W
- Location: West Street, Boston

History
- Built: 1904

Site notes
- Architect: James Rowell
- Architectural style: Edwardian Baroque style

The Municipal Buildings are in West Street, Boston, a town in Lincolnshire, in England. The complex accommodates the offices and meeting place of Boston Borough Council.

== History ==
The first municipal building in Boston was the guildhall which was completed in 1390. In the early 19th century, the fish market at the centre of the Exchange Buildings in the Market Place was converted for municipal use and subsequently became the offices of Boston Corporation, which was duly reformed in 1836 in accordance with the Municipal Corporations Act 1835. In the late 19th century, civic leaders decided to commission more substantial premises. The site they selected was on the south side of West Street.

The new building was designed by James Rowell in the Edwardian Baroque style, built in red brick with terracotta dressings and was officially opened by the mayor, Alderman Joseph Cooke, in 1904. The design involved an asymmetrical main frontage of 10 bays facing onto West Street. The first bay on the left featured a large opening with voussoirs and a keystone which originally led to the main foyer. There were doorways in the third and seventh bays and access for the fire engine in the eighth and ninth bays. The fourth bay contained a semi-circular balcony on the first floor. The whole building was fenestrated by windows of differing style but with banded surrounds. The second, fourth, sixth, eighth and tenth bays were all surmounted by stepped gables. Internally, the principal rooms were the council chamber, with ornate stained glass windows, the offices for the council officers, the offices for the local police service and garaging for the fire engines.

The whole complex was dedicated to municipal use after both the fire service and the police service relocated to Lincoln Lane. It continued to serve as the headquarters of the borough council for much of the 20th century and remained the meeting place for the enlarged Boston Borough Council which was formed in 1974. The building also continued to serve as the local registration office with a ceremony room available for weddings and civil partnership ceremonies.
