= Lincolnshire (district) =

- Proposed unitary authority area
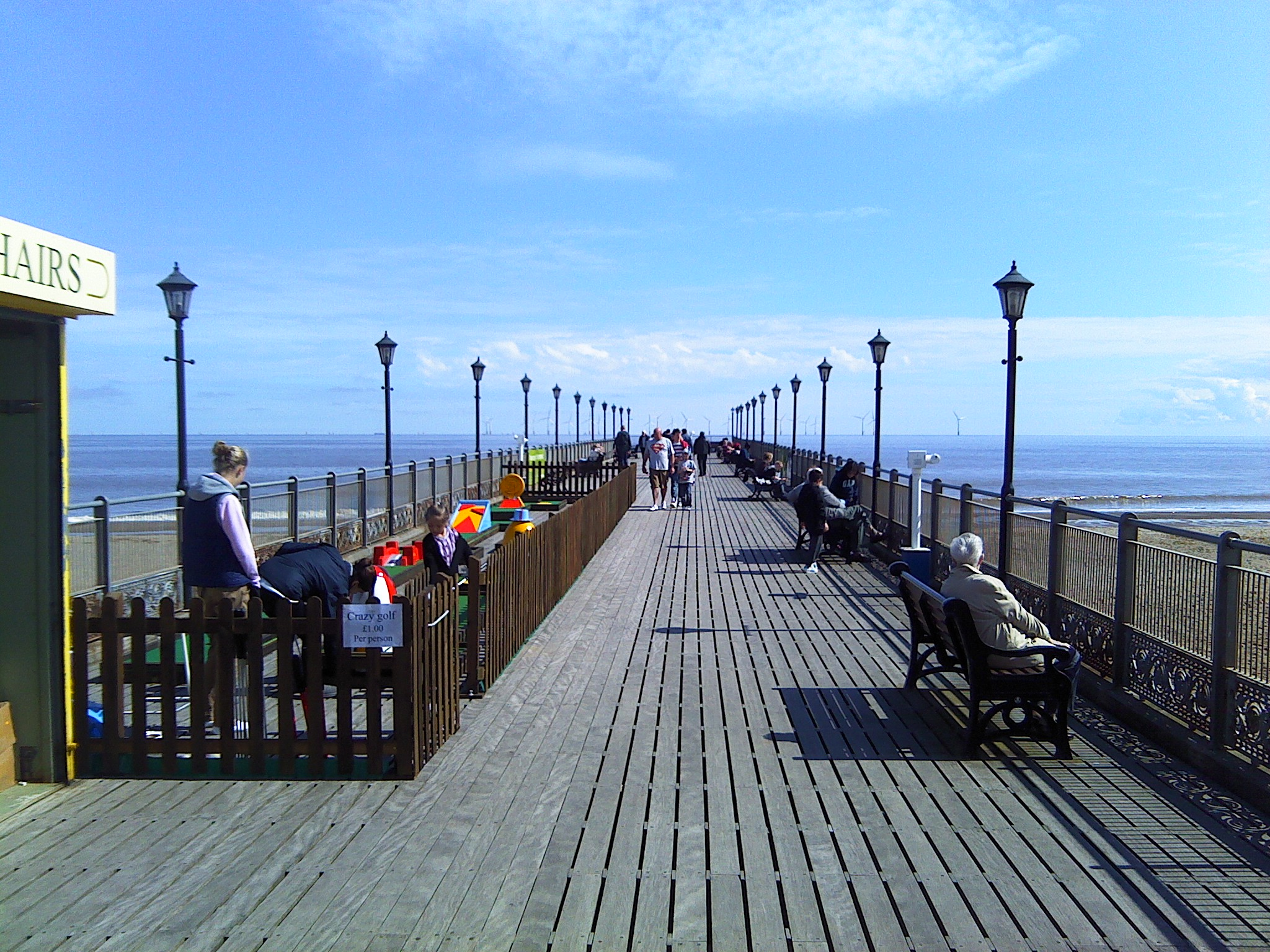
- Skegness Pier

- Interactive map
- Coordinates: 52.9120°N 0.64224°W
- Sovereign state: United Kingdom
- Country: England
- Region: East Midlands
- Ceremonial county: Lincolnshire

Government
  - Type: Unitary authority
  - Body: Lincolnshire Council

Area
  - Total: 1,980 sq mi (5,120 km^{2})

Population (2024 estimate)
  - Total: 581,253
- Time zone: UTC+0 (GMT)
  - Summer (DST): UTC+1 (BST)

Lincolnshire or Rural Lincolnshire was a proposed unitary authority area in the ceremonial county of Lincolnshire, England. It was planned to be formed on 1 April 2028, with elections planned to be held to a shadow authority in May 2027. The largest settlement would have been Grantham and it would have also included Bourne, Boston, Gainsborough, Horncastle, Louth, Mablethorpe, Market Rasen, Skegness, Sleaford, Spalding and Stamford. Plans to create it were halted in September 2026 and the first election was cancelled. In October 2026, plans to create it were withdrawn.

== Formation ==
It was to be formed from the existing Lincolnshire districts of Boston, East Lindsey, South Kesteven, South Holland and portions of West Lindsey and North Kesteven. The remaining portions of those districts would have formed part of a Lincoln unitary authority. Boston and Spalding are currently unparished, the rest of the area is parished. The area has a population of about 574,000.

The district is being formed as part of ongoing local government changes throughout England, in which all areas of the country that have separate county councils and district councils will see those replaced with single-tier, or unitary, local governance. The proposals for Lincolnshire also considered the future of North Lincolnshire and North East Lincolnshire; the alternative proposal for four unitaries for the larger area, and the proposals for two or three unitaries for this area were not accepted.

In September 2026, the Lincolnshire proposals were halted by the government and placed under review. The 2027 election was cancelled. In October 2026, plans to create it were withdrawn. The decision was threatened with judicial review by Lincolnshire County Council and South Kesteven District Council.

== Governance ==
It would have been run by Lincolnshire Council, which would have comprised 100 councillors.
