= Boston Guildhall =

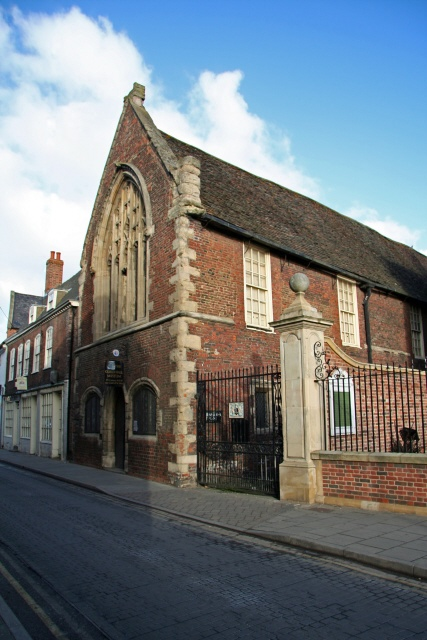

- Location within Lincolnshire
- 52.9759°N 0.0231°W
- Location: Boston, Lincolnshire

History
- Built: 1390

Listed Building – Grade I
- Designated: 20 November 1975
- Reference no.: 1389007

Boston Guildhall is a former municipal building in Boston, Lincolnshire. Built in 1390 and altered through the centuries, in the early 21st century it was restored and now serves as a local museum and also as a venue for civil ceremonies and private functions. It is a Grade I listed building.

== History ==
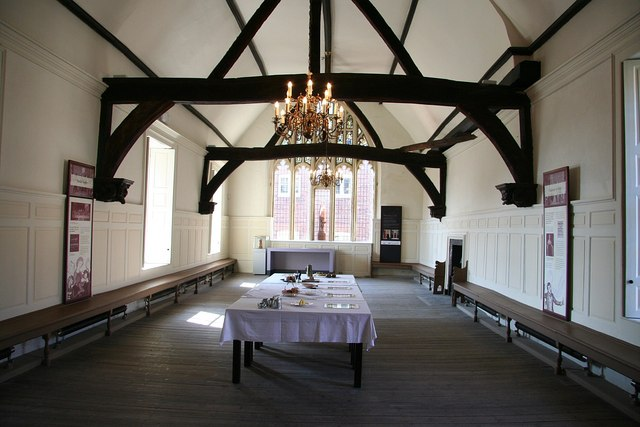
The banqueting hall

St. Mary's Guild in Boston was founded as a merchant guild by a group of individuals in 1260. The guildhall, based on evidence from dendrochronology, was built in 1390, two years before incorporation of the guild and probably in anticipation of that event. The guild became wealthy as a result of extensive gifts received in the 14th and 15th centuries; an inventory shows that it held various items of gold, silver and gilt, as well as the sacred relics. In the 16th century, it established one of the country's richest trades in indulgences (in direct competition with Austin Friars). As a result of the dissolution of the chantries and religious guilds, imposed by King Edward VI, the guildhall was confiscated by the Crown and passed to the Boston Corporation in 1555.

In autumn 1607 a group of Puritans led by William Brewster, now known as the Pilgrim Fathers, were brought before the magistrates in the guildhall, accused of seeking to travel to Holland without the King's permission (which was required). They were discharged by the magistrates and lived in Boston for several months before reaching Holland the following year by another route; they later sailed from Plymouth in the Mayflower for the New World in 1620, settling in what became the Massachusetts Bay Colony.

As the building was increasingly used for civic purposes in the 18th century, ongoing changes were put in place which removed or masked much of the building's medieval fabric. Pishey Thompson, writing in 1856, claimed that "the interior of the building is so completely modernised that nothing of the original but the construction of the roof is visible". After the new Sessions House in Church Close was completed in 1842, the guildhall ceased to be used as a place for the administration of justice. After the new Municipal Buildings in West Street were completed in 1904, the guildhall ceased to have any municipal role.

The guildhall operated a restaurant which served as a National Soup Kitchen in the First World War and as a British Restaurant in the Second World War but was forced to close after an outbreak of food poisoning in 1949. The whole building was restored after receiving £1 million in support from the Heritage Lottery Fund in 2008.

== Architecture ==
The walls consist of two faces of brickwork between which is a rubble core matrix. The bonding of the brickwork is characteristic of a late medieval date. Irregular shaped bricks are laid in a fairly thick mortar and in a haphazard bond consisting largely of rows of stretchers with the occasional header used to bond the two wall surfaces together. This construction pre-dated the widespread adoption of English Bond (alternating courses of headers and stretchers) and Flemish bond (alternating headers and stretchers in each course) in England. The courses of brickwork are bonded together with a lime-based 'common mortar' which was originally pointed back flush with the wall face. It survives on the bedding planes and is exposed in several places on the north elevation.

== Guildhall collection ==
Works of art include a portrait, painted by Thomas Phillips, of Sir Joseph Banks, recorder of Boston in 1813, who sailed with Captain James Cook aboard the Endeavour on the first great voyage to discover Australia. The guildhall also holds a copy of Foxe's Book of Martyrs and artefacts from various archaeological excavations.

== See also ==
- Guild
- Guildhall Museum
