= Wyberton =

Village in Lincolnshire, England

Coordinates: 52.954041°N 0.041179°W

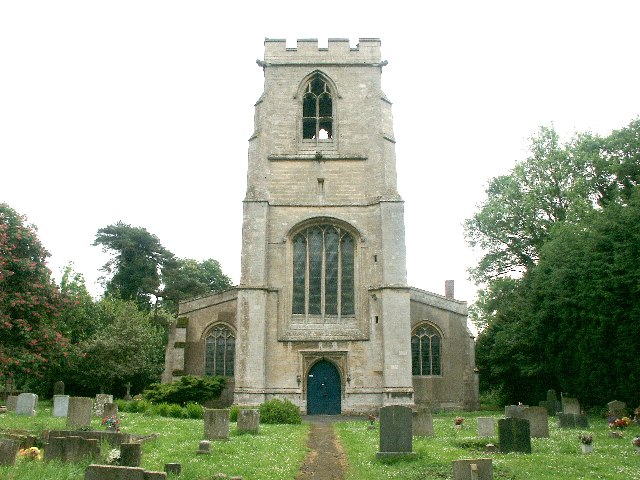
- St Leodegar's Church, Wyberton

- Location within Lincolnshire
- Population: 3,747 (2011)
- OS grid reference: TF316414
  - London: 100 mi (160 km) S
- District: Boston
- Shire county: Lincolnshire
- Region: East Midlands
- Country: England
- Sovereign state: United Kingdom
- Post town: BOSTON
- Postcode district: PE21
- Dialling code: 01205
- Police: Lincolnshire
- Fire: Lincolnshire
- Ambulance: East Midlands
- UK Parliament: Boston and Skegness

Wyberton is a village in Lincolnshire, England. It lies just south-west of Boston, and on the B1397 – the former A16 London Road – between Boston and Kirton. The A16 bisects the village. The population of the civil parish at the 2011 census was 3,747.

Wyberton is one of eighteen parishes which, together with Boston, form the Borough of Boston. The local government has been arranged in this way since the reorganization of 1 April 1974, which resulted from the Local Government Act 1972. Wyberton forms an electoral ward in itself. Since the local elections in May 2011, Wyberton has two Boston Borough Councillors, James Knowles (Conservative) and Richard Austin (Boston District Independents)

Hitherto, the parish had formed part of Boston Rural District, in the Parts of Holland. Holland was one of the three divisions – formally known as "parts" – of the traditional county of Lincolnshire. Since the Local Government Act 1888, Holland had been in most respects a county in itself.

== History ==
Wyberton is listed in the 1086 Domesday Book with 36 households and a church.

The lost hamlet of Tytton was mentioned in 1316 and is now represented by Tytton Hall, a modern farm-house, near which is the moated site of the earlier mansion. Margart Tytton of Wyberton married John Coppeldyke, who was Sheriff of the county in 1488. The Tytton name does not appear in the Register Book of 1538, and the family had probably become extinct by that time. Wyberton Woad mill operated by steam was owned by Mr J Short until 1901/2.

== Landmarks ==
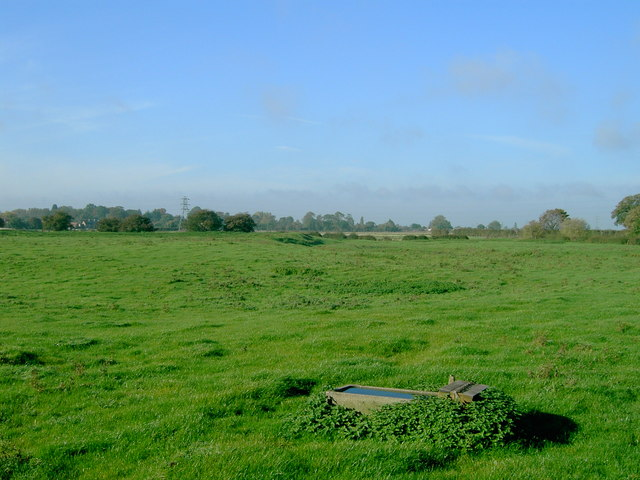
Site of Wyberts Castle

The parish church is a Grade I listed building dedicated to Saint Leodegar and dating from the late 12th century, although it was rebuilt around 1420. The chancel was rebuilt in 1760 and the church was restored by George Gilbert Scott Junior about 1880. The original church had a crossing tower which collapsed in 1419. The font is 15th century and there is a charity board in the north aisle dated 1794. In the north aisle there is a 14th-century black marble slab to Adam of Frampton and his wife. Records in the Chancery Court refer to proceedings between 1426 and 1432 where Roger Derrys, a London mason, was suing for payment following the rebuilding of Church tower and nave. The chancel rebuilding was carried out at the same time as the refronting of the Rectory, now Wyberton Park, by the Rector Dr John Shaw. The church's 14th-century font is from St Margaret Westwick in Norwich, Norfolk. It features an octagonal bowl decorated with shields in encircled quatrefoils on each face, and eight shafts around its stem.

Wyberton Park, the tiled-roof red brick Grade II* listed former rectory 100 yards (90 m) to the south of the church, was built in 1689 by the incumbent, to replace a mud and stud rectory with one containing a "kitchen, parlour, large staircase rising from the entrance door, two chambers, a large study and small closets on the second storey and garrets, and a large porch with steps ascending to it at the entrance." This improved rectory is seen by historian T. W. Beastall as indicating growing prosperity through increased acreage for crops and husbandry precipitated by fen drainage during the Agricultural Revolution. The present house is a further 1761 part rebuild.

Wyberts Castle is a scheduled medieval moated site located at the south end of Wybert Lane, about 1 mile (1.6 km) east of Wyberton. Excavations undertaken in 1959-1960 revealed remains of stone structures on the eastern half of the island, associated with pottery which suggested that the moated site was occupied during the 12th and 13th centuries and possibly until the 15th century. In the 18th century it was known as 'Wells Slade', suggesting that it was held by the Wells family who had a manor in Wyberton in the 14th century. The name 'Wybert's Castle' is thought to be of late 19th-century origin.

The village public house is the Pincushion Inn on London Road to the south of the village.

Population of Wyberton Civil Parish
Year	1801	1811	1821	1831	1841	1851	1881	1891	1901	1911	1921	1931	1951	1961	2001	2011
Population	477	353	487	530	584	647	646	659	627	653	664	829	1,809	2,889	3,790	3,747

== Notable former inhabitants ==
- William Webster – Builder – associated with a number of Thames embankments.
