= Skirbeck =

Coordinates: 52.97°N 0.01°W

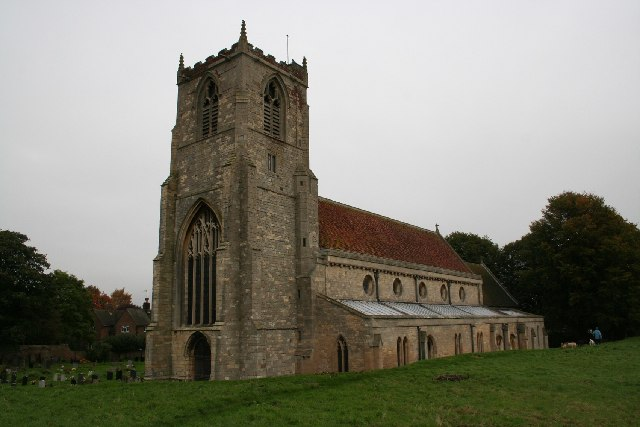
- Church of St Nicholas, Skirbeck

- Location within Lincolnshire
- Population: 8,272 (Ward Profile)
- OS grid reference: TF333435
  - London: 100 mi (160 km) S
- District: Boston
- Shire county: Lincolnshire
- Region: East Midlands
- Country: England
- Sovereign state: United Kingdom
- Post town: Boston
- Postcode district: PE21
- Police: Lincolnshire
- Fire: Lincolnshire
- Ambulance: East Midlands
- UK Parliament: Boston and Skegness

Skirbeck is a historic village and suburb of Boston, in Lincolnshire, England. Skirbeck is a long v-shaped formation wrapped around the south and east side of Boston parish. It has been incorporated into the Borough of Boston since 1932. It is in the Skirbeck ward of Boston Borough Council.

== History ==
That name originates from the words "skirn" and "bekkr" meaning "clear stream". Skirbeck appears in two entries in the Domesday Book of 1086, when it was recorded as consisting of a total of 42 households and had two churches and two fisheries.

St Leonard's Hospital for ten poor people was founded around 1220 and was held by the Knights Hospitallers of St John of Jerusalem from about 1230. It was later united with the Preceptory at Maltby. In 1542 it was granted to Charles Duke of Suffolk, and may have continued as an almshouse. It appears to have been located on the west side of the Maud Foster Drain, opposite the present Hospital Bridge. An old house known as Jerusalem House may have been built of material from the hospital, however this has been disputed by the St Leonards Trust who believe the present bedehouses stand on the site of the original hospital.

The parish church is set by the bank of the River Witham, and is thought to predate the foundation of St Botolph's Church in Boston. Dedicated to Saint Nicholas it is a Grade II* listed building dating from the 13th century. It was restored between 1869 and 1875 by Sir George Gilbert Scott, and in 1899 a restoration of the western tower took place. Between 1933 and 1935 a chancel by LT Moore was added.

Skirbeck village

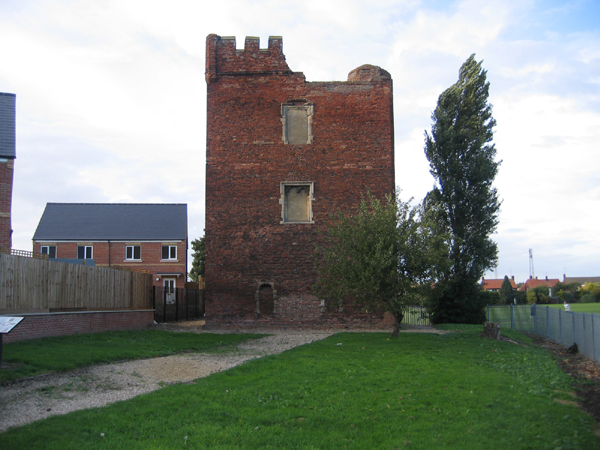
Hussey Tower

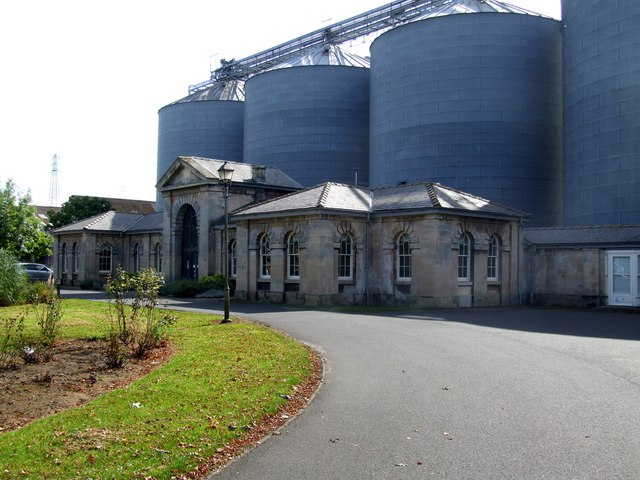
Boston Workhouse frontage, Skirbeck

The Grade II* listed Hussey Tower was a 14- and 15th-century brick tower with an octagonal turret, originally known as Benyington Tower. It was sold to Boston Corporation and dismantled after 1545 when it was forfeited by Lord Hussey.

Boston Workhouse was built in 1837 by George Gilbert Scott. It was built near the site of the medieval hospital of St John. The Grade II listed front range of the workhouse still exists, but the rear ranges were demolished in 1980.

Boston House of correction was in Skirbeck Quarter and was erected in 1809. From 1826 it was only used to hold prisoners for trial, and after 1837 Boston borough gaol became available and Skirbeck House of correction closed. In 1849 it was converted into a lock-up.

Holy Trinity Grade II listed church in Skirbeck Quarter, which was a chapel of ease to Skirbeck, was built 1846–48 by Sir George Gilbert Scott. In 1988 it was added to by John Webster of Leeds.

Saint Thomas Church in Skirbeck Quarter started as a classroom of the original school building in 1866, and in 1885 became a "tin tabernacle". Need for a permanent brick building was recognised and the church was begun in 1909 and completed in 1912. It was built by Temple Moore and is a Grade II listed building.

Skirbeck Woad mill closed down in 1938, the last miller was Thomas Booth.

In 1931 the civil parish had a population of 4518. On 1 April 1932 the parish was abolished and merged with Boston and Fishtoft.

Population of Skirbeck Civil Parish
Year	1801	1811	1821	1831	1841	1851	1881	1891	1901	1911	1921	1931
Population	539	714	1,307	1,578	1,931	2,429	2,550	3,023	3,644	4,036	4,174	4,518

Population of Skirbeck Quarter Civil Parish
Year	1881	1891	1901	1911	1921	1931
Population	854	854	975	1,201	1,201	1,740

== Demographics ==
At the 2021 census, the ward profile population was 8,272. Of the findings, the ethnicity and religious composition of the ward was:

Skirbeck: Ethnicity: 2021 Census
Ethnic group	Population	%
White	7,790	94.2%
Mixed	147	1.8%
Other Ethnic Group	143	1.7%
Asian or Asian British	129	1.6%
Black or Black British	53	0.6%
Arab	9	0.2%
Total	8,272	100%

The religious composition of the ward at the 2021 Census was recorded as:

Skirbeck: Religion: 2021 Census
Religious	Population	%
Christian	4,967	65%
Irreligious	2,492	32.6%
Muslim	129	1.7%
Other religion	34	0.4%
Hindu	14	0.2%
Buddhist	10	0.2%
Jewish	1	0.1%
Total	8,272	100%
