= Blue Revolution Party =

Blue Revolution
- Leader: Rosalyn Parker-Lee
- Founder: Mike Gilbert
- Founded: 16 March 2017; 9 years ago
- Headquarters: 22 Tower Street, Boston, Lincs, PE21 8RX
- Ideology: Localism; Non-partisan democracy "Small State Socialism"
- Political position: Syncretic
- Colors: Blue
- Boston Borough Council: 1 / 30

Website
- abluerevolution.org

Blue Revolution is a British political party based in Boston, Lincolnshire. It was founded in 2017 by former Conservative Boston borough councillor, Mike Gilbert. The party aims to give many people, from various backgrounds, the chance to run in elections, without traditional party structures. It tries to achieve this by giving anyone who endorses the party's core values of "Contract", "Choice" and "Consent" the ability to use its logo, branding and party material.

== History ==
It was founded in 2017 to "give blue collar workers more representation" in a political system that founder Mike Gilbert viewed as being too elitist and tribal. Gilbert stood as a candidate for Boston and Skegness in the general election of that year. He came last with 0.7% of the vote.

In 2019, the party formed an alliance with the Bostonian Independent Group for the local election that May, in an effort to tackle issues such as fly-tipping and anti-social behaviour. None of Blue Revolutions candidates were elected.

The party stood in five divisions under the name "For the People not the Party" in the 2021 Lincolnshire County Council election but didn't get any councillors elected.

In the 2023 Boston Borough Council election, Gilbert was elected as the party's first councillor, taking one of the two seats available in the Staniland Ward.

Gilbert stood in Boston and Skegness for a second time, in the 2024 general election. He was unsuccessful in winning the seat, receiving 1% of the vote.

== Manifesto ==
Blue Revolution describes itself as "The home of small state socialism" and "not a traditional right or left-wing platform". Instead it views itself as a brand identity, that avoids the bureaucracy of traditional parties. The party believes that the British political system has failed for the past 40 years, with negative effects including the Iraq War, the sale of council houses, the introduction of university tuition fees, and excessive consumerism.

Although it intends for its elected candidates to be functionally independent, it does have a manifesto built around five broad aims:

1. Raise awareness of the need to end party based political systems, including banning whipping.
2. To increase the power of people and reduce the power of the "state-funded elite".
3. To reduce elitism and unfairness through the principles of "Contract", "Choice" and "Consent".
4. Build an economy that is not based on debt.
5. Reducing demand to reverse environmental destruction and ending the use of economic growth as an objective for policy.
