= Frampton, Lincolnshire =

Village and civil parish in the Borough of Boston, Lincolnshire, England

Coordinates: 52.9342°N 0.0321°W

Frampton
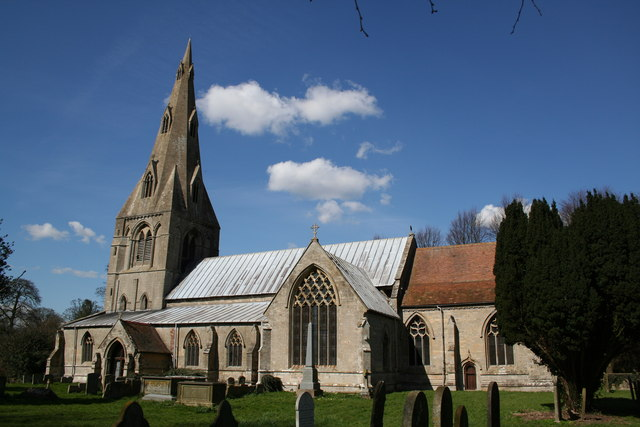
- St Mary's Church, Frampton.

- Location within Lincolnshire
- Population: 1,299 (2011)
- OS grid reference: TF326402
  - London: 95 mi (153 km) S
- Civil parish: Frampton
- District: Boston
- Shire county: Lincolnshire
- Region: East Midlands
- Country: England
- Sovereign state: United Kingdom
- Post town: BOSTON
- Postcode district: PE20
- Dialling code: 01205
- Police: Lincolnshire
- Fire: Lincolnshire
- Ambulance: East Midlands
- UK Parliament: Boston and Skegness

Frampton is a village and civil parish in the Borough of Boston, Lincolnshire, England. The village is situated approximately 3 miles (5 km) south from the town of Boston and to the east (the seaward side) of the A16, which runs along the townlands. The village lies on the edge of one of the great marine creek levees formed during the Bronze Age, 2 to 2.5 miles (3 to 4 km) from the modern salt marsh. The population of the civil parish at the 2011 census was 1,299.

The village is one of eighteen parishes which, together with Boston, form the Borough of Boston in the county of Lincolnshire. Local governance of Frampton was reorganised on 1 April 1974, as a result of the Local Government Act 1972. The parish forms its own electoral ward.

Hitherto, the parish had formed part of Boston Rural District, in the Parts of Holland. Holland was one of the three divisions (formally known as parts) of the traditional county of Lincolnshire. Since the Local Government Act 1888, Holland had been in most respects, a county in itself.

== Landmarks ==
The limestone church of Saint Mary dates from the 12th century and is a Grade I listed building which was restored in 1796 and 1890.

Easthampton has an active bell ringing group based in the old church of St Mary's, holding minor records in this field.

A second church, that of Saint Michael and All Angels, was a private chapel for the Tunnard family who lived at Frampton House. It was built in 1860 by James Fowler, and is a Grade II listed building. Today it is a chapel of ease.

Frampton Hall, a Grade II* listed red-brick country house, was built in 1725 by Coney Tunnard, who was High Sheriff of Lincolnshire. It is now owned by the Lord Davies of Stamford.

The red-brick Frampton House, is Grade II* listed and was built in 1792 for Thomas Tunnard. It is now a care home.

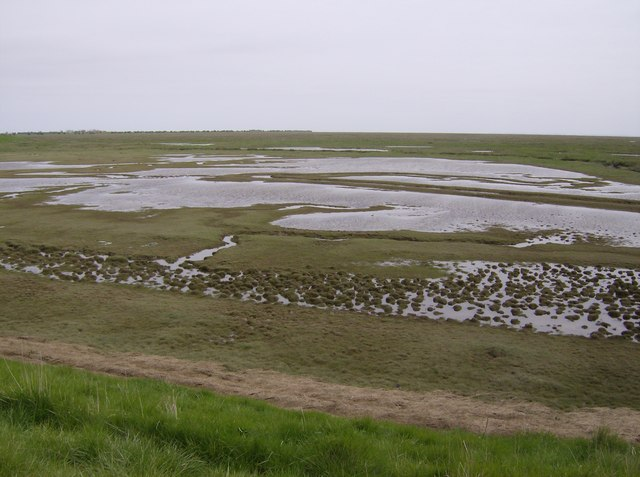
Frampton Marsh

Frampton Marsh is a nature reserve which lies to the east of the village, between the outfalls of the River Witham (The Haven), and the River Welland. Part of the marsh belongs to the Lincolnshire Wildlife Trust, the majority being owned by the RSPB and being designated RSPB Frampton Marsh. It is a Ramsar site, and the whole of The Wash area is a designated Special Protection Area.
