= Borough of Boston =

Coordinates: 52.95°N 0.15°W

- Non-metropolitan district and borough
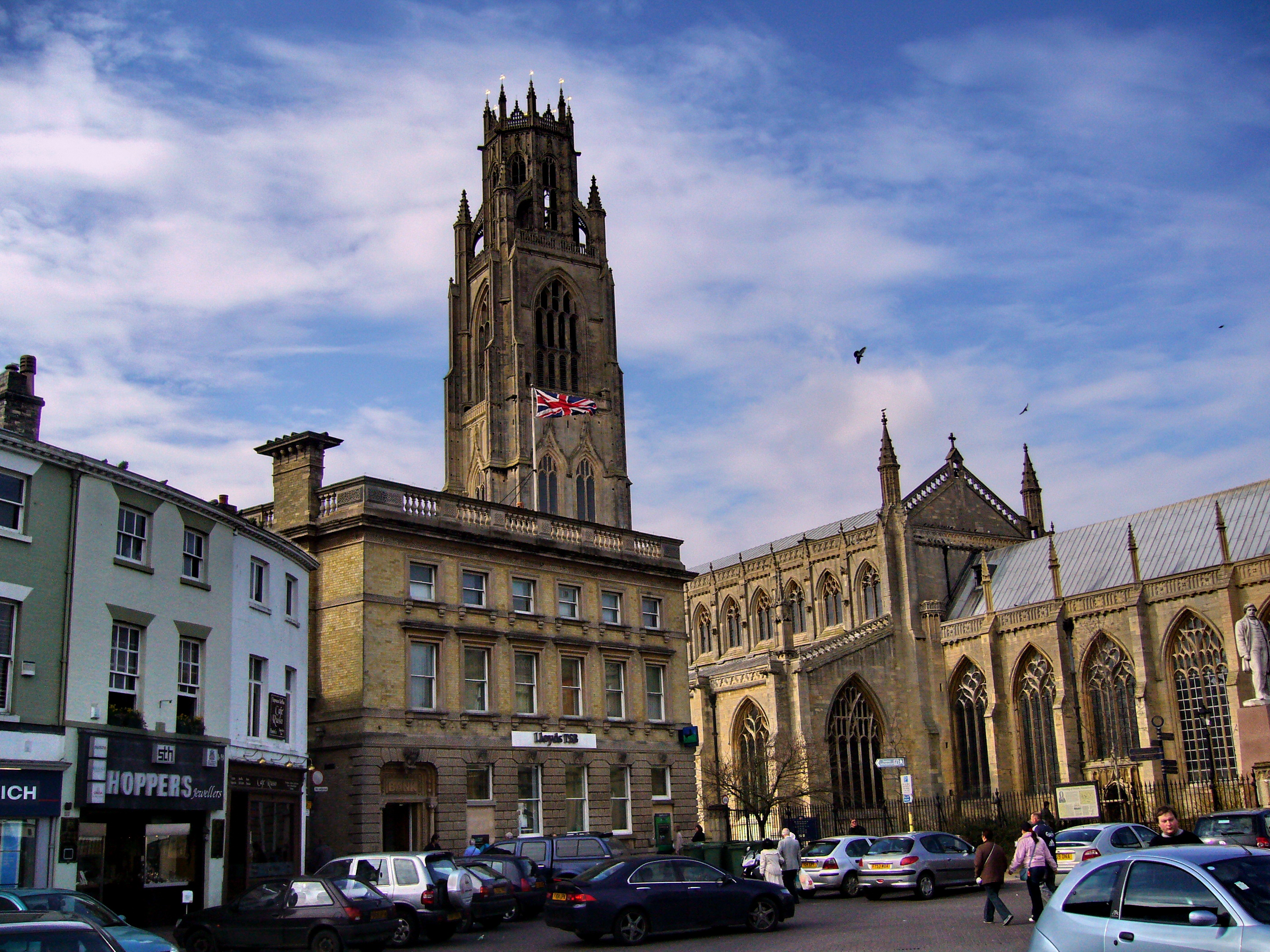
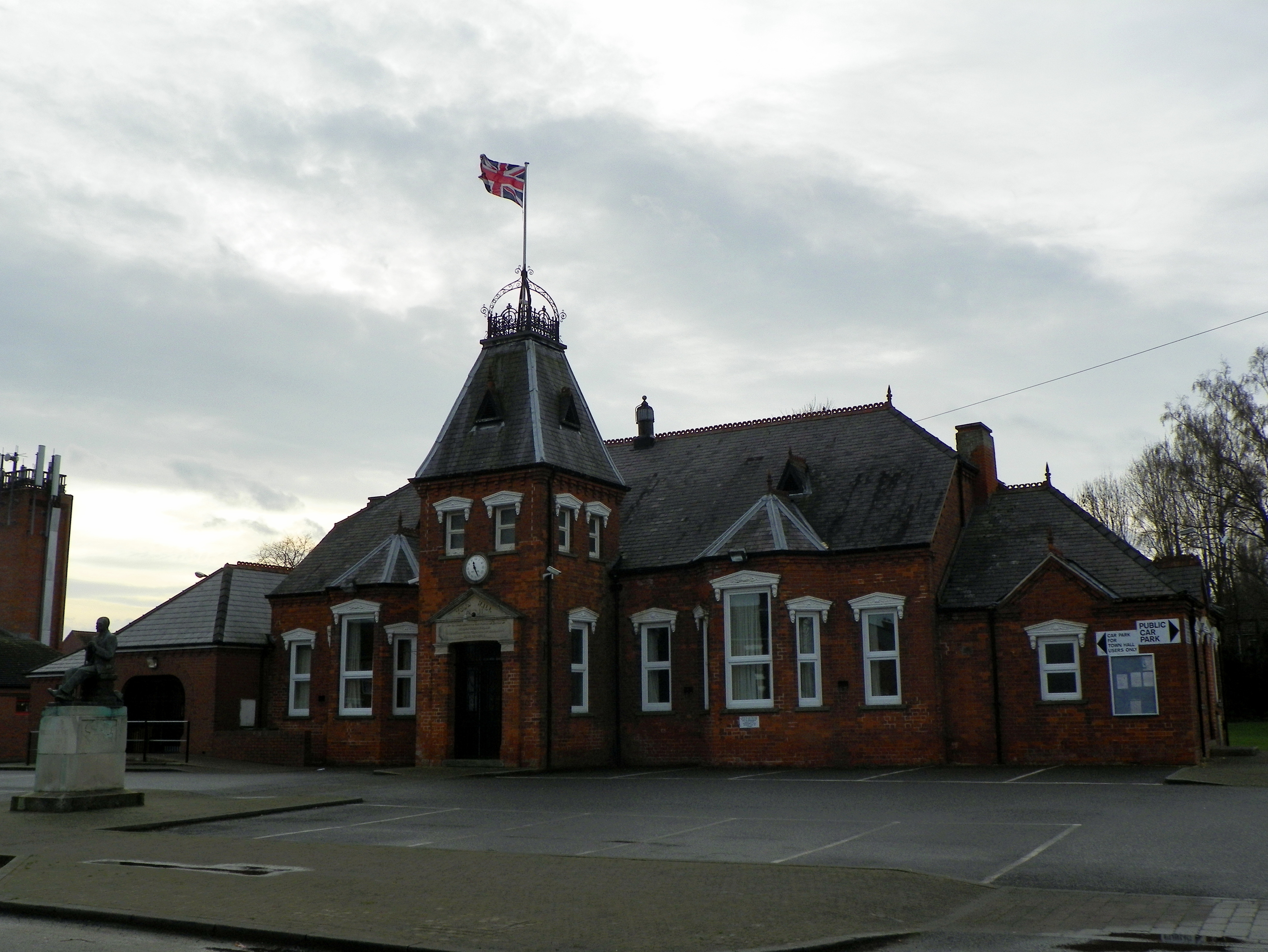
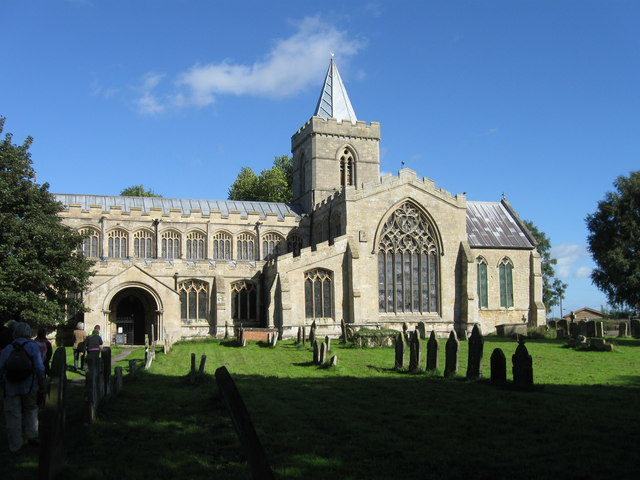
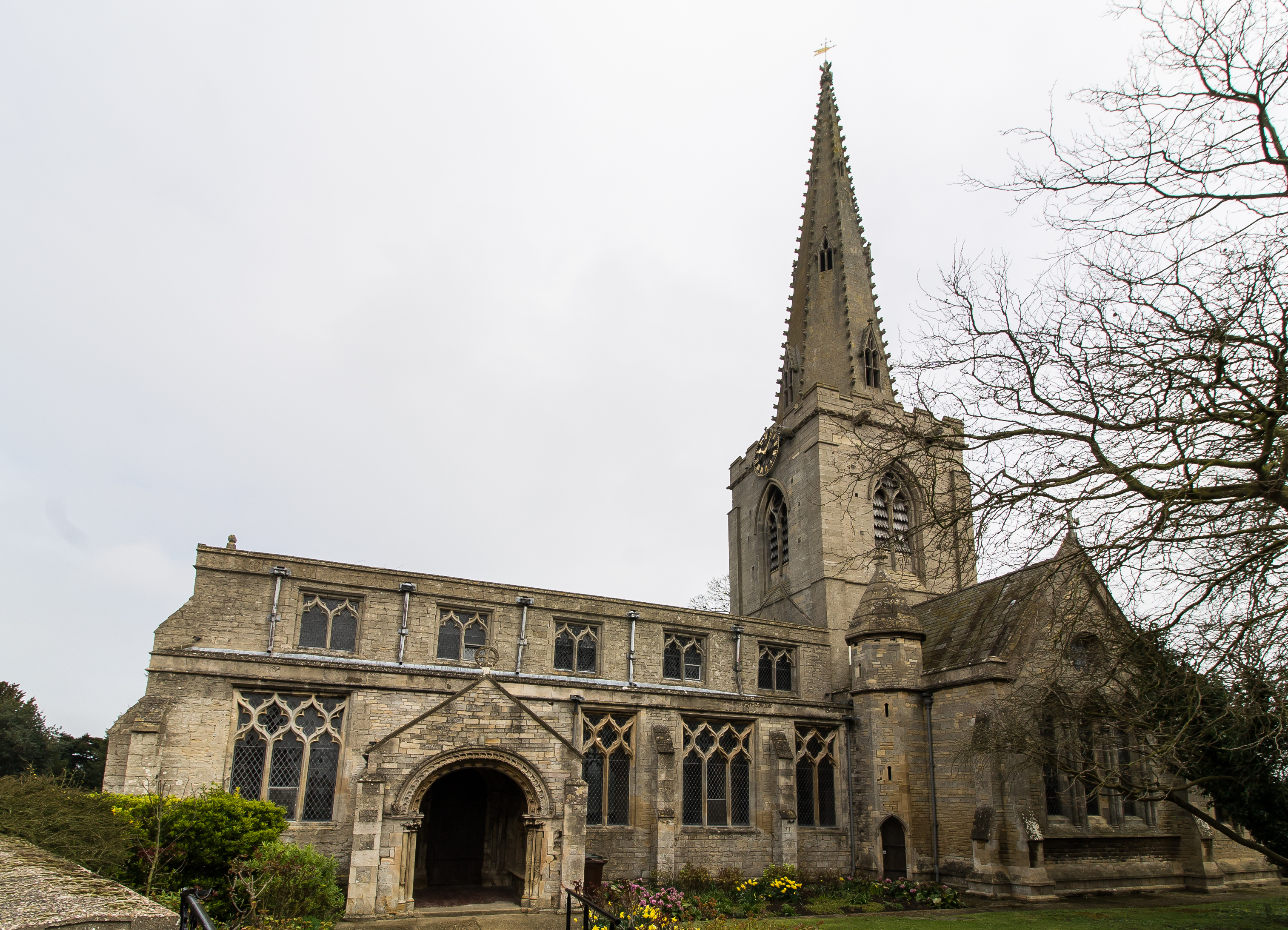
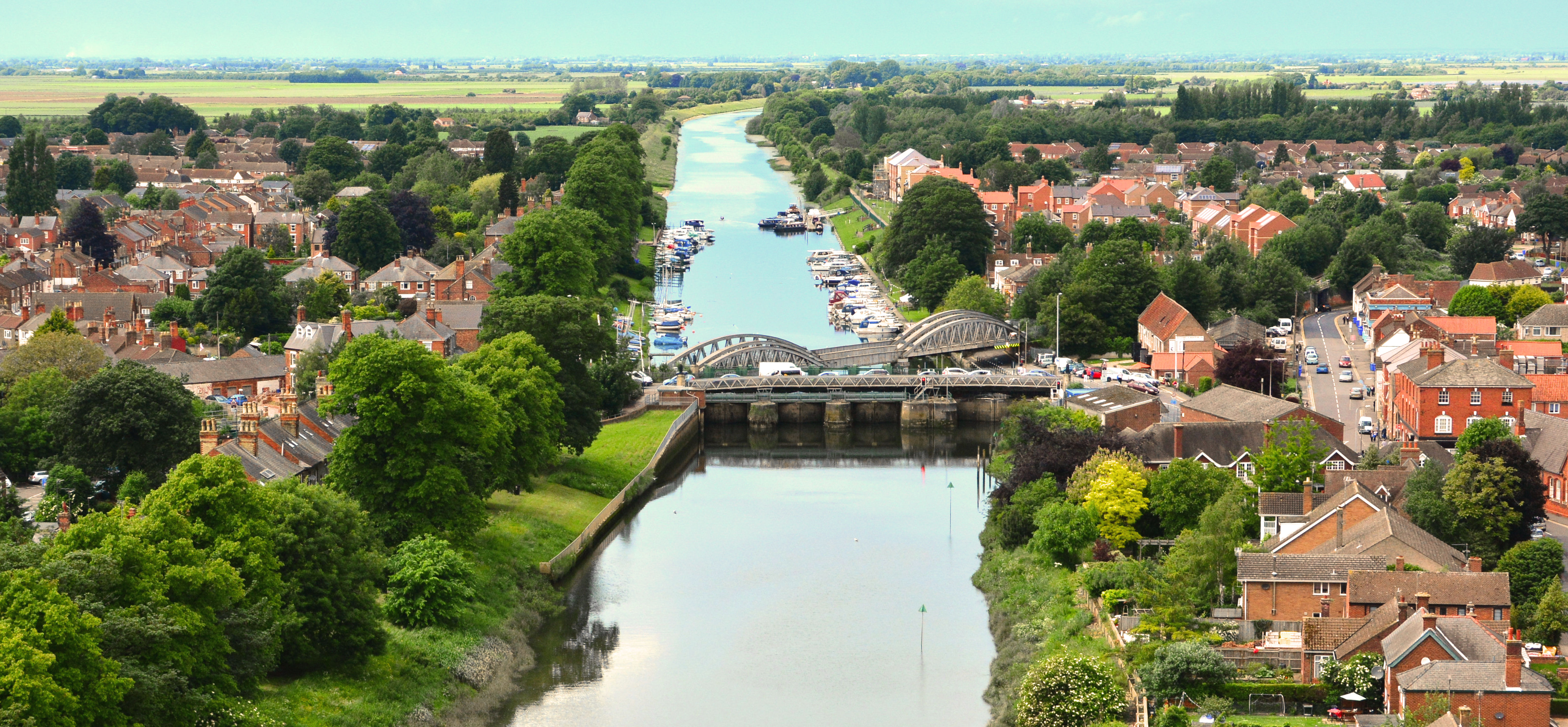
- From left to right; Top: Boston Stump and Boston town centre; Middle: Kirton town hall and Algarkirk church; Bottom: Sutterton church and aerial of the town centre and waterways/bridges

- Shown within the ceremonial county of Lincolnshire
- Sovereign state: United Kingdom
- Constituent country: England
- Region: East Midlands
- Administrative county: Lincolnshire
- Admin. HQ: Boston

Government
  - Type: Boston Borough Council
  - MP: Richard Tice

Area
  - Total: 141 sq mi (364 km^{2})
  - Rank: 97th

Population (2024)
  - Total: 64,637
  - Rank: Ranked 285th
  - Density: 460/sq mi (178/km^{2})

Ethnicity (2021)
  - Ethnic groups: List: 94.7% White; 2% Asian; 1.4% Mixed; 1% other; 0.7% Black

Religion (2021)
  - Religion: List: 64% Christianity; 33.4% no religion; 1.5% Islam; 0.4% Hinduism; 0.2% Buddhism; 0.4% other
- Time zone: UTC+0 (Greenwich Mean Time)
  - Summer (DST): UTC+1 (British Summer Time)
- ONS code: 32UB (ONS); E07000136 (GSS)

The Borough of Boston is a local government district with borough status in Lincolnshire, England. Its council is based in the town of Boston. The borough also covers an extensive rural area, including the villages of Kirton, Wyberton, Sutterton, Algakirk and Hubberts Bridge.

The borough borders South Holland to the south, North Kesteven to the west, and East Lindsey to the north. To the east, it has a coast onto the Wash.

== History ==
The town of Boston had been incorporated as an ancient borough in 1545. It was reformed to become a municipal borough in 1836.

The modern borough was created on 1 April 1974 under the Local Government Act 1972, by merging the municipal borough of Boston with Boston Rural District. The new district was named Boston after its only town. Boston's borough status passed to the enlarged district from its creation, allowing the chair of the council to take the title of mayor, continuing Boston's series of mayors dating back to 1545. The borough covers the northern part of Holland, one of the three traditional Parts of Lincolnshire. Holland had been an administrative county between 1889 and 1974.

In 2020 the council agreed to share its management and other staff with neighbouring East Lindsey District Council. South Holland District Council joined the partnership in 2021, which is now described as the "South and East Lincolnshire Councils Partnership".

Under current local government reorganisation plans, all district councils in Lincolnshire, as well as the county council, will be abolished in 2028, with the district being combined with others and forming part of a Lincolnshire unitary authority.

== Governance ==
Boston Borough Council

Type
- Type: Non-metropolitan district

Leadership
- Mayor: Jonathan Noble, Reform UK since 18 May 2026
- Leader: Dale Broughton, Independent since 20 July 2025
- Chief Executive: Robert Barlow (Note: Joint chief executive of Boston Borough Council, East Lindsey District Council and South Holland District Council) since 1 July 2020

Structure
- Seats: 30 councillors
- Graph of the party split among 30 seats.
- Political groups: Administration (20) Independent (15) Conservative (4) Blue Revolution (1) Other parties (10) Independent (8) Liberal Democrats (1) Reform UK (1)

Elections
- Voting system: First past the post
- Last election: 4 May 2023
- Next election: 6 May 2027

Meeting place
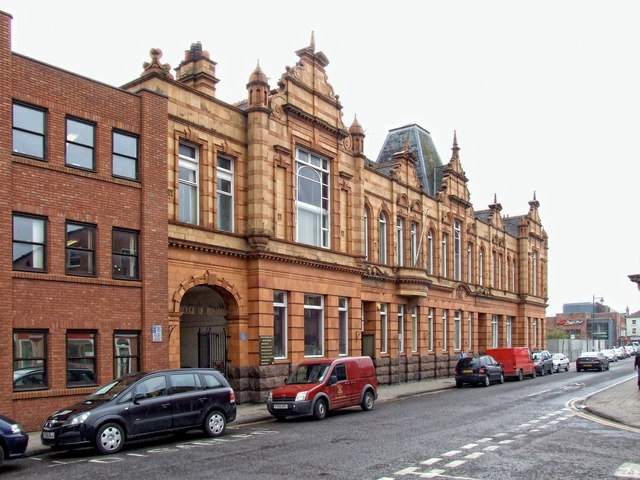
- Municipal Buildings, West Street, Boston, PE21 8QR

Website
- www.boston.gov.uk

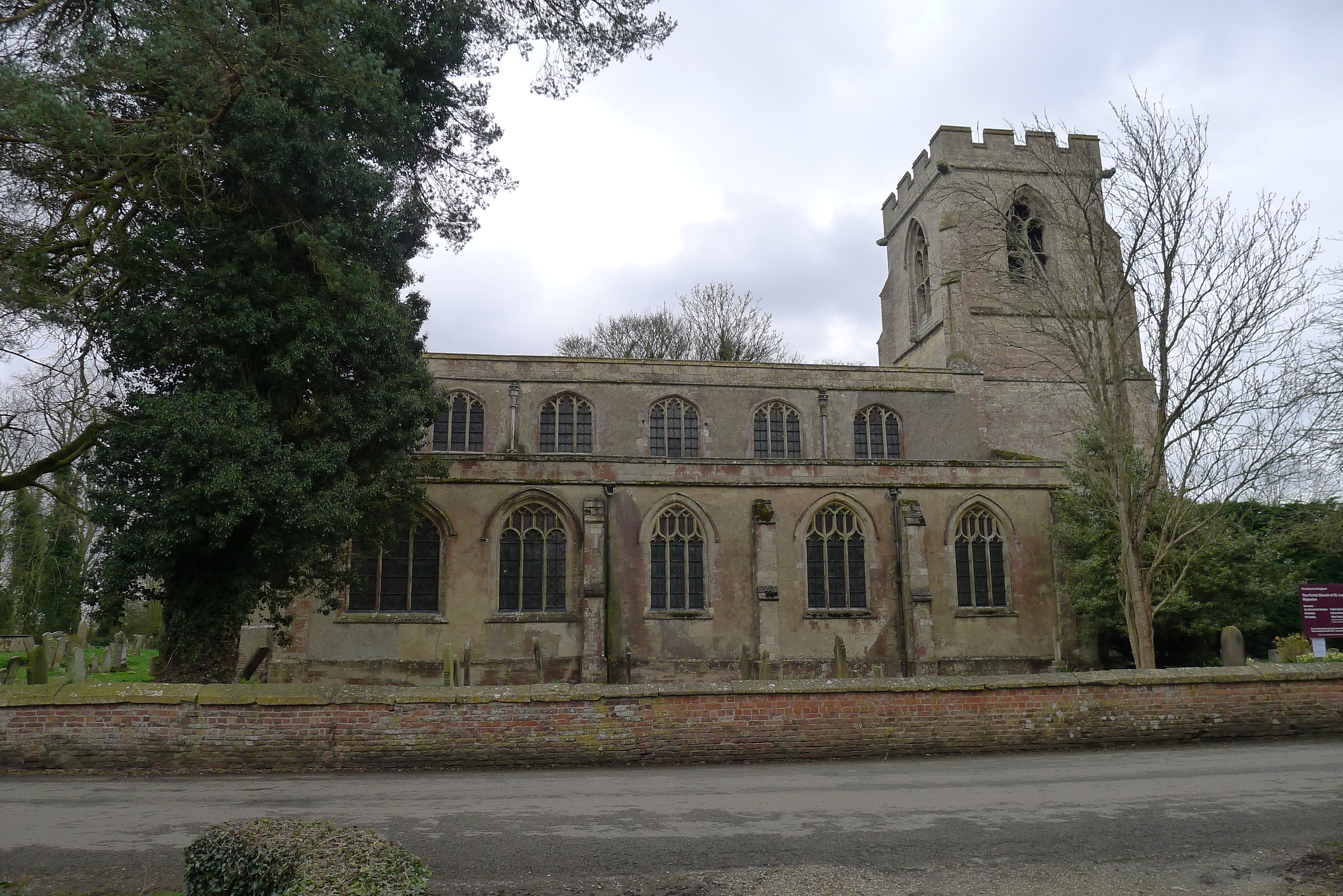
Wyberton, one of the many villages in the borough

Boston Borough Council provides district-level services. County-level services are provided by Lincolnshire County Council. Much of the borough is covered by civil parishes, which form a third tier of local government.

=== Political control ===
At the 2023 election, a majority of the seats were won by local party the Boston Independents. In July 2025, most of the party's members left to form a new Progressive Independent group, which subsequently formed a coalition with the 20-20 Independent group and the Conservatives to run the council, led by Dale Broughton of the Progressive Independent group, formerly deputy leader of the Boston Independents. As of September 2026, all cabinet positions are held by members of the Progressive Independent group, the Conservatives and the Blue Revolution councillor.

Political control of the council since the 1974 reforms has been as follows:

Party in control	Years
No overall control	1974–2007
Boston Bypass Independents	2007–2011
Conservative	2011–2015
No overall control	2015–2019
Conservative	2019–2020
No overall control	2020–2023
Boston Independent	2023–2025
Independent	2025–present

=== Leadership ===
The role of mayor is largely ceremonial in Boston. Political leadership is instead provided by the leader of the council. The leaders since 2000 have been:

Councillor	Party	From	To
Joyce Dobson	Conservative	Nov 2000	2006
Mary Wright	Conservative	18 May 2006	May 2007
Richard Austin	Boston Bypass Independents	24 May 2007	May 2011
Peter Bedford	Conservative	25 May 2011	15 May 2017
Michael Cooper	Conservative	15 May 2017	15 Jul 2019
Aaron Spencer	Conservative	15 Jul 2019	20 Jan 2020
Paul Skinner	Conservative	3 Feb 2020	May 2023
Anne Dorrian	Boston Independents	22 May 2023	20 Jul 2025
Dale Broughton	Independent	20 Jul 2025	

=== Composition ===
Following the 2023 election, and subsequent by-elections and changes of allegiance up to September 2026 the composition of the council was:

Party	Councillors
Independent	23
Conservative	4
Blue Revolution	1
Liberal Democrats	1
Reform	1
Total	30

Fifteen of the independent councillors sit together as the "Progressive Independent" group. The Liberal Democrat and five of the independent councillors sit together as the "20-20 Independent Group". The other three independent councillors form the "Boston Independents" group.

=== Elections ===
Since the last boundary changes in 2015 the council has comprised 30 councillors representing 15 wards, with each ward electing one, two or three councillors. Elections are held every four years. A map of the wards is available, as is a map showing the Local Government Boundary Commission for England's final recommendations for ward boundaries, October 2012.

The wards, and their numbers of councillors, are:

- Coastal (2)
- Fenside (2)
- Fishtoft (3)
- Five Villages (2)
- Kirton and Frampton (3)
- Old Leake and Wrangle (2)
- Skirbeck (3)
- St Thomas' (1)
- Staniland (2)
- Station (1)
- Swineshead and Holland Fen (2)
- Trinity (2)
- West (1)
- Witham (2)
- Wyberton (2)

=== Premises ===
The council is based at the Municipal Buildings on West Street in Boston. The building was built in 1902 for the old borough council to the designs of architect James Rowell.

== Parishes ==
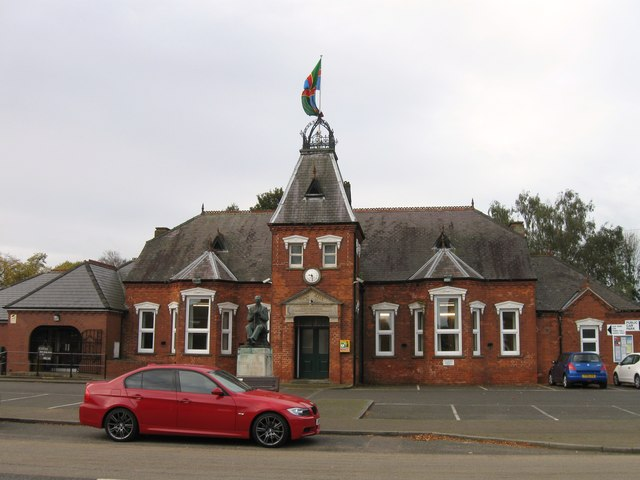
Kirton, one of the borough's larger villages

Much of the borough is covered by civil parishes, the exception being the pre-1974 municipal borough of Boston, which is an unparished area. The parishes are:

- Algakirk
- Amber Hill
- Benington
- Bicker
- Butterwick
- Fishtoft
- Fosdyke
- Frampton
- Freiston
- Holland Fen with Brothertoft
- Kirton
- Leverton
- Old Leake
- Sutterton
- Swineshead
- Wigtoft
- Wrangle
- Wyberton

== 2016 EU referendum ==
On 23 June 2016 the Borough of Boston voted in the UK-wide Referendum on membership of the European Union (EU) under the provisions of the European Union Referendum Act 2015. In a turnout of 77%, over 75% voted to leave the EU, the highest leave majority of the 382 UK voting areas. The local MP Matt Warman, a Conservative, had campaigned for a "Remain" vote.

United Kingdom European Union membership referendum, 2016; Borough of Boston
Choice	Votes	%
Leave the European Union	22,974	75.56%
Remain a member of the European Union	7,430	24.44%
Valid votes	30,404	99.96%
Invalid or blank votes	12	0.04%
Total votes	30,416	100.00%
Registered voters and turnout	39,963	77.27%

Borough of Boston referendum result (without spoiled ballots):
Leave: 22,974 (75.6%)	Remain: 7,430 (24.4%)
▲

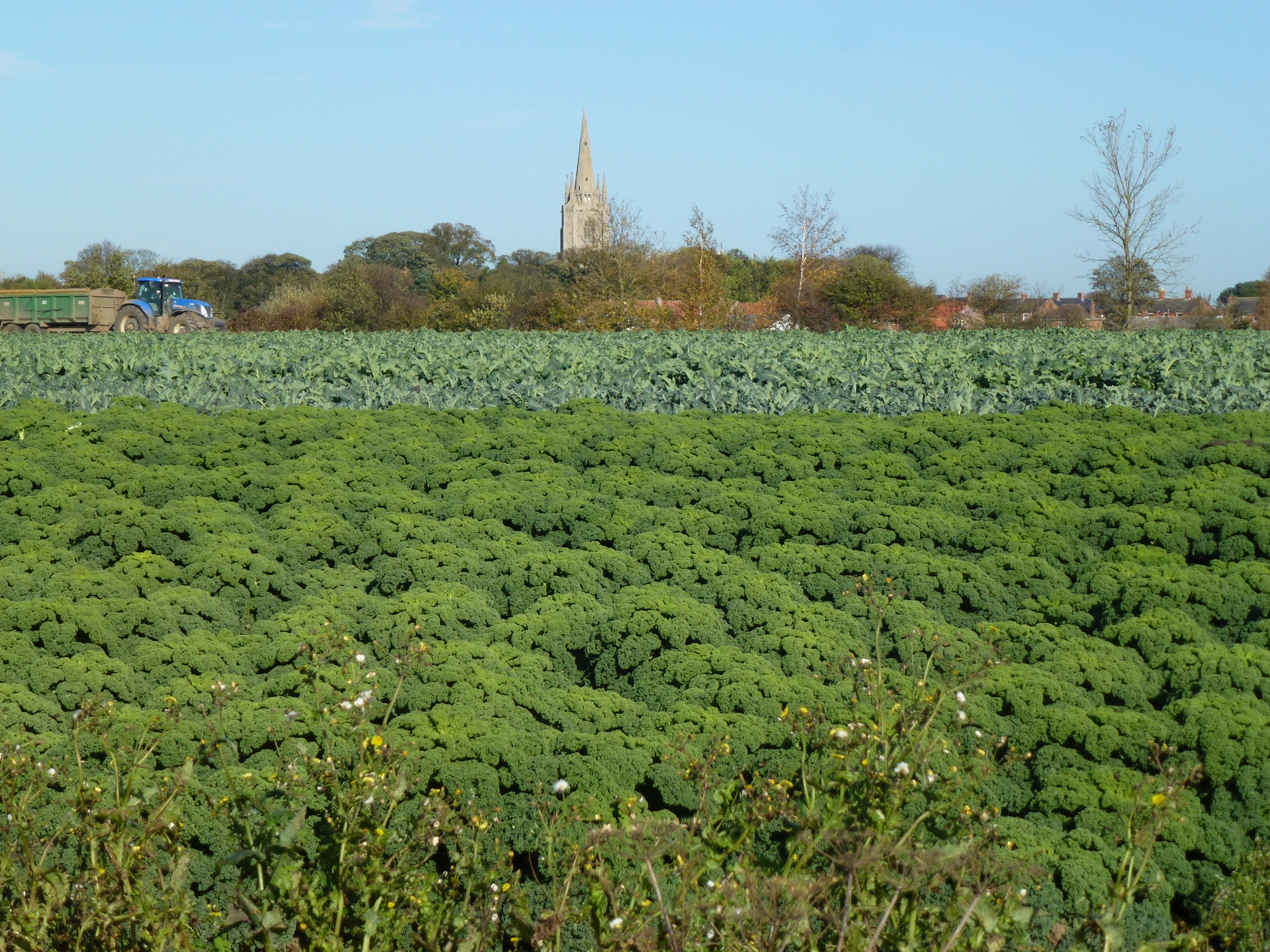
Swineshead, one of the many villages of the borough

== Freedom of the Borough ==
The following people and military units have received the Freedom of the Borough of Boston.

=== Individuals ===
- Professor Sir Jonathan Van-Tam: 21 March 2022.
- David Medlock: 17 April 2023.

=== Military Units ===
- RAF Coningsby: 16 May 1963.

== Arms ==
Coat of arms of Borough of Boston

Crest
On a wreath of the colours a demi-lion Or holding between the forepaws a woolsack Proper charged with a ram couchant Or.
Escutcheon
Or on a chevron Azure three coronets each composed of crosses paty and fleurs-de-lys Or on a chief Sable a garb between two pairs of windmill sails also Or.
Supporters
On either side a mermaid Proper crined and finned Or upon a compartment of waves barry wavy Azure and Argent.
Motto
Serve With Amnity
