= Politics of Lincolnshire =

Lincolnshire is a ceremonial county in England, United Kingdom. The ceremonial county is a combination of the non-metropolitan county of Lincolnshire and two unitary authority areas in the north. The non-metropolitan county is governed by the Lincolnshire County Council, which is Reform and Conservative controlled, and further divided into seven district councils.

Two further districts - North East Lincolnshire and North Lincolnshire - are unitary authorities because they were previously districts of the controversial Humberside county from 1974. In 1996, Humberside was abolished along with its county council. However some services in those districts are still shared with the East Riding of Yorkshire ceremonial county, rather than the rest Lincolnshire.

Lincolnshire is represented by 11 Members of Parliament (MPs). As of the 2019 general election, all 11 constituencies are represented by the Conservative Party.

== UK Parliament ==
Lincolnshire is represented by 11 Members of Parliament (MPs). As of the 2019 general election, all 11 constituencies are represented by the Conservative Party.

2019 general election: Lincolnshire
Conservative	Labour	Liberal Democrat	Green	Others	Turnout
348,325 (66.0%) ▲34,217	120,808 (22.9%) ▼54,307	35,049 (6.6%) ▲16,645	10,564 (2.0%) ▲4,532	13,271 (2.5%) ▼7,870	528,006▼9,266

Overall numbers of seats as of 2019
Conservative	Labour	Liberal Democrat	Green	Others
11	0	0	0	0

Parliamentary constituencies
Constituency	District	MP	Party
Boston and Skegness	Boston, East Lindsey	Matt Warman	Conservative
Brigg and Goole	North Lincolnshire (plus part in East Riding of Yorkshire)	Andrew Percy	Conservative
Cleethorpes	North East Lincolnshire, North Lincolnshire	Martin Vickers	Conservative
Gainsborough	West Lindsey, East Lindsey	Edward Leigh	Conservative
Grantham and Stamford	South Kesteven	Gareth Davies	Conservative
Great Grimsby	North East Lincolnshire	Lia Nici	Conservative
Lincoln	Lincoln, North Kesteven	Karl McCartney	Conservative
Louth and Horncastle	East Lindsey	Victoria Atkins	Conservative
Scunthorpe	North Lincolnshire	Holly Mumby-Croft	Conservative
Sleaford and North Hykeham	North Kesteven, South Kesteven	Caroline Johnson	Conservative
South Holland and The Deepings	South Holland, South Kesteven	John Henry Hayes	Conservative

== Local government ==
=== Non-metropolitan county ===
Map showing the results of the 2021 Lincolnshire County Council election.

The party Reform UK control the county council, with 44 of the 70 seats. North Lincolnshire and North East Lincolnshire are unitary authorities and do not form part of the non-metropolitan county of Lincolnshire.

==== 2009 County Council elections ====
The Conservative Party comfortably controlled the County Council after the 2009 local election, in which they increased their majority to 43 seats. The Labour Party lost a total of 15 seats including seven in Lincoln, whilst the Liberal Democrats lost three. The Lincolnshire Independents gained a total of four seats, although one of their number moved to the Conservative group during 2010, increasing the number of Conservative seats to 61. The collective group of the Lincolnshire Independents, the Boston Bypass Party and other independent councillors formed the opposition for the four-year term.

==== 2013 County Council elections ====
In the 2013 County Council election, the Conservatives lost their overall majority and formed a coalition with the Liberal Democrats and independents. The UK Independence Party made significant gains from the Conservatives, particularly around the town of Boston, due to opposition to Eastern European immigration.

UKIP were initially the main opposition party with 16 councillors, but six members broke away to form a separate group, UKIP Lincolnshire.

==== 2017 County Council elections ====
The 2017 Lincolnshire County Council election took place on 4 May 2017 and saw a local landslide victory for the Conservatives, who won 58 out of the 70 seats. UKIP was left without a single seat. Labour lost four seats, reducing their number of seats to six, the Liberal Democrats were reduced to one seat, and the Lincolnshire Independents were also reduced to a single seat after losing eight seats. Four other independents were elected.

==== 2021 County Council elections ====
The 2021 Lincolnshire County Council election took place on 6 May 2021. It saw another landslide victory for the Conservatives, with them winning 54 seats. Independents won five seats, Labour lost two, bringing their total down to four, and the Liberal Democrats gained two in West Lindsey, raising their total to three. The newly formed South Holland Independents won three seats, whilst the Lincolnshire Independents held their sole representative on the council.

==== 2025 County Council elections ====
In the 2025 Lincolnshire County Council election, Reform UK took control of Lincolnshire County Council. The Reform UK candidate, the former Conservative MP Andrea Jenkyns, was elected Mayor of Greater Lincolnshire.

== National referendums ==
=== 1975 EC membership referendum ===
The 1975 EC membership referendum was the first major referendum to be held in the county, and saw one of the largest majority votes in favour of continued membership of the then European Communities (which would later become the European Union) within non-metropolitan Lincolnshire and also Humberside, which then included northern parts of historic Lincolnshire. The referendum was held on 5 June 1975 with votes within the county being centrally counted under the provisions of the Referendum Act 1975 where voters were asked to decide on the question “Do you think that the United Kingdom should stay in the European Community (the Common Market)?” by voting for either “Yes” or “No”. The result was declared on the following day.

1975 United Kingdom European Communities(Common Market) membership referendum Non-metropolitan Lincolnshire
Choice	Votes	%
Yes	180,603	74.75%
No	61,011	25.25%
Valid votes	241,614	99.82%
Invalid or blank votes	445	0.18%
Total votes	242,059	100.00%
Registered voters and turnout	370,518	63.70%

Referendum results (without spoiled ballots):
Yes: 180,603 (74.7%)	No: 61,011 (25.3%)
▲

- The result above only includes non-Metropolitan Lincolnshire as parts of historic northern Lincolnshire made up part of Humberside at the time.

County	Yes votes	No votes	Yes	No	Turnout
Humberside	257,826	122,199	67.8%	32.2%	62.4%

=== 2011 AV referendum ===
The 2011 United Kingdom Alternative Vote referendum was the first to be held in Lincolnshire since the 1975 EC membership referendum and was only the second time that the people of Lincolnshire have been asked to vote in a referendum. The referendum asked voters whether to replace the present "first-past-the-post" (simple plurality) system with the "alternative vote" (AV) method for electing MPs to the House of Commons in future general elections. The proposal to introduce AV was overwhelmingly rejected by voters with all eight counting areas within Lincolnshire returning significant "no" votes.

United Kingdom Alternative Vote referendum, 2011 Lincolnshire
Choice	Votes	%
No	232,034	75.19%
Yes	76,570	24.81%
Valid votes	308,604	99.49%
Invalid or blank votes	1,593	0.51%
Total votes	310,197	100.00%
Registered voters and turnout	722,210	40.17%

Referendum results (without spoiled ballots):
Yes: 76,570 (24.8%)	No: 232,034 (75.2%)
▲

- The result above includes all areas within historic Lincolnshire

The seven shire-districts and two unitary authorities in Lincolnshire were used as the voting areas.

Counting areas	Turnout %	No votes	Yes votes	No %	Yes %
Boston	39.58	13,337	3,958	77.11	22.89
East Lindsey	42.60	34,045	10,571	76.31	23.69
Lincoln	36.68	16,099	6,951	69.84	30.16
North East Lincolnshire	34.23	29,484	9,549	75.54	24.46
North Lincolnshire	39.57	36,031	12,542	74.18	25.82
North Kesteven	42.95	27,397	7,926	77.56	22.44
South Holland	39.83	20,542	5,603	78.57	21.43
South Kesteven	42.63	32,217	11,247	74.12	25.88
West Lindsey	43.70	22,882	8,223	73.56	26.44

=== 2016 EU membership referendum ===
On 23 June 2016, in the EU referendum, the people of Lincolnshire voted for the second time on the issue of the UK's continued membership of what is now known as the European Union under the provisions of the European Union Referendum Act 2015 where voters were asked to decide on the question “Should the United Kingdom remain a member of the European Union or leave the European Union” by voting for either “Remain a member of the European Union” or “Leave the European Union”. Of the eleven MPs which represented the ceremonial county at the time six MPs Andrew Percy, Martin Vickers, Edward Leigh, Karl McCartney, Stephen Phillips and John Hayes supported a "Leave" vote with five MPs Matt Warman, Nick Boles, Victoria Atkins, Melanie Onn and Nic Dakin supported a "Remain" vote.

United Kingdom European Union membership referendum, 2016 Lincolnshire
Choice	Votes	%
Leave the European Union	380,556	65.98%
Remain a member of the European Union	196,184	34.02%
Valid votes	576,740	99.95%
Invalid or blank votes	308	0.05%
Total votes	595,954	100.00%
Registered voters and turnout	780,761	73.91%

Referendum results (without spoiled ballots):
Leave:380,556 (66%)	Remain: 196,184 (34%)
▲

- The result above includes all areas within historic Lincolnshire

The seven shire-districts and two unitary authorities in Lincolnshire were used as the voting areas.

Voting areas	Turnout %	Remain votes	Leave votes	Remain %	Leave %
Boston	77.2%	7,430	22,974	24.4%	75.6%
East Lindsey	74.9%	23,515	56,613	29.3%	70.7%
Lincoln	69.3%	18,902	24,992	43.1%	57.0%
North East Lincolnshire	67.9%	23,797	55,185	30.1%	69.9%
North Lincolnshire	71.9%	29,947	58,915	33.7%	66.3%
North Kesteven	78.4%	25,570	42,183	37.7%	62.3%
South Holland	75.3%	13,074	36,423	26.4%	73.6%
South Kesteven	78.2%	33,047	49,424	40.1%	60.0%
West Lindsey	74.5%	20,906	33,847	38.2%	61.8%

== Police and Crime Commissioners ==
The most recent elections for Police and Crime Commissioners within the Lincolnshire and Humberside police force areas took place on 2 May 2024.

=== Lincolnshire Police ===
2024 Lincolnshire police and crime commissioner election
Party	Candidate	Votes	%	±%
Conservative	Marc Jones	39,639	36.5	−23.2
Labour Co-op	Mike Horder	31,931	29.5	+9.5
Reform	Peter Escreet	15,518	14.3	+10.8
Liberal Democrats	Lesley Rollings	13,380	12.4	+6.4
English Democrat	David Dickason	7,739	7.2	N/A
Turnout		108,207	19.09	
Conservative hold		Swing		

=== Humberside Police ===
2024 Humberside police and crime commissioner election
Party	Candidate	Votes	%	±%
Conservative	Jonathan Evison	51,083	39.7	−5.9
Labour Co-op	Simon O'Rourke	46,846	36.4	−3.0
Liberal Democrats	Bob Morgan	30,834	24.0	+8.9
Turnout		128,769	18.7	
Conservative hold		Swing		
