= North Kesteven District Council elections =

Local government elections in Lincolnshire, England

North Kesteven District Council in Lincolnshire, England is elected every four years.

== Council elections ==
- 1973 North Kesteven District Council election
- 1976 North Kesteven District Council election
- 1979 North Kesteven District Council election (New ward boundaries)
- 1983 North Kesteven District Council election (District boundary changes took place but the number of seats remained the same)
- 1987 North Kesteven District Council election (District boundary changes took place but the number of seats remained the same)
- 1991 North Kesteven District Council election (District boundary changes took place but the number of seats remained the same)
- 1995 North Kesteven District Council election
- 1999 North Kesteven District Council election (New ward boundaries)
- 2003 North Kesteven District Council election
- 2007 North Kesteven District Council election (New ward boundaries increased the number of seats by three)
- 2011 North Kesteven District Council election
- 2015 North Kesteven District Council election
- 2019 North Kesteven District Council election
- 2023 North Kesteven District Council election (District boundary changes took place but the number of seats remained the same)

== Results maps ==
2003 results map

2007 results map

2011 results map

2015 results map

2019 results map

2023 results map

== Election results ==
	Overall control	Conservative	Labour	Lib Dems	Lincolnshire Independents	Hykeham Independents	Independent
2023	Conservative	25	2	0	11	0	5
2019	NOC	20	0	0	16	0	6
2015	Conservative	28	0	0	8	1	6
2011	Conservative	27	0	3	3	0	10
2007	Conservative	25	0	4	0	0	14
2003	NOC	18	4	5	0	0	13

== By-election results ==
=== 1995-1999 ===
Sleaford West By-Election 1 August 1996
Party	Candidate	Votes	%	±%
Labour		323	50.9	
Liberal Democrats		312	49.1	
Majority		11	1.8	
Turnout		635	37.0	
Labour hold		Swing		

Osbournby By-Election 20 February 1997
Party	Candidate	Votes	%	±%
Conservative		188	27.9	
Independent		157	23.3	
Liberal Democrats		151	22.4	
Independent		99	14.7	
Labour		79	11.7	
Majority		31	4.6	
Turnout		674	50.0	
Conservative gain from Independent		Swing		

Skellingthorpe By-Election 19 June 1997
Party	Candidate	Votes	%	±%
Labour		343	47.3	−3.2
Independent		161	22.2	+3.4
Independent		132	18.2	+18.2
Liberal Democrats		89	12.3	+1.9
Majority		182	25.1	
Turnout		725		
Labour gain from Independent		Swing		

Washingborough By-Election 19 June 1997
Party	Candidate	Votes	%	±%
Labour		497	61.4	+36.6
Conservative		313	38.6	+6.0
Majority		184	22.8	
Turnout		810		
Labour gain from Independent		Swing		

=== 1999-2003 ===
Brant Broughton By-Election 4 May 2000
Party	Candidate	Votes	%	±%
Conservative		469	59.6	+12.0
Liberal Democrats		318	40.4	−12.0
Majority		151	19.2	
Turnout		787	44.0	
Conservative gain from Liberal Democrats		Swing		

Heighington & Washingborough By-Election 13 July 2000
Party	Candidate	Votes	%	±%
Conservative		885	67.7	+11.4
Labour		423	32.3	−11.4
Majority		462	35.4	
Turnout		1,308		
Conservative gain from Labour		Swing		

Heckington Rural By-Election 12 October 2000
Party	Candidate	Votes	%	±%
Conservative		491	57.8	+19.7
Liberal Democrats		358	42.2	+8.3
Majority		133	15.6	
Turnout		849	24.1	
Conservative hold		Swing		

Ruskington By-Election 12 October 2000
Party	Candidate	Votes	%	±%
Conservative		476	44.4	+12.5
Liberal Democrats		315	29.4	+4.9
Labour		164	15.3	−0.3
Independent		118	11.0	−17.0
Majority		161	15.0	
Turnout		1,073	28.9	
Conservative hold		Swing		

North Hykeham Memorial By-Election 6 September 2001
Party	Candidate	Votes	%	±%
Liberal Democrats		349	75.7	+11.8
Conservative		96	20.8	+20.8
Independent		16	3.5	+3.5
Majority		253	54.9	
Turnout		461		
Liberal Democrats gain from Independent		Swing		

=== 2003-2007 ===
Sleaford Castle By-Election 5 August 2004
Party	Candidate	Votes	%	±%
Conservative		148	29.8	−14.1
Labour		141	28.4	−6.4
Liberal Democrats		128	25.8	+4.6
Independent		80	16.1	+16.1
Majority		7	1.4	
Turnout		497	24.8	
Conservative hold		Swing		

Branston & Mere By-Election 25 May 2006
Party	Candidate	Votes	%	±%
Conservative	Marjorie Duncan	570	49.1	
Independent		440	37.9	
Labour		150	13.0	
Majority		130	11.2	
Turnout		1,160		
Conservative gain from Labour		Swing		

=== 2007-2011 ===
Heighington and Washingborough By-Election 4 June 2009
Party	Candidate	Votes	%	±%
Conservative	Ian Carrington	928	44.1	−30.6
Lincolnshire Independent	Hannah Woodruff	786	37.3	+37.3
Independent	Graham Peck	391	18.6	+18.6
Majority		142	6.8	
Turnout		2,105	39.4	
Conservative hold		Swing		

Branston By-Election 6 May 2010
Party	Candidate	Votes	%	±%
Conservative	Raymond Cucksey	1,309	46.2	−26.0
Independent	Peter Lundgren	1,202	42.4	+42.4
BNP	Michael Clayton	325	11.5	+11.5
Majority		107	3.8	
Turnout		2,836		
Conservative hold		Swing		

=== 2011-2015 ===
Heckington Rural By-Election 29 March 2012
Party	Candidate	Votes	%	±%
Conservative	Sally Tarry	578	53.1	−2.6
Lincolnshire Independent	Liz Peto	510	46.9	+20.6
Majority		68	6.2	
Turnout		1,088		
Conservative hold		Swing		

Sleaford Holdingham By-Election 11 July 2013
Party	Candidate	Votes	%	±%
Independent	Grenville Jackson	140	37.6	+37.6
Labour	Mike Benthall	79	21.2	+21.2
Independent	Ken Fernandes	57	15.3	+15.3
UKIP	John Dilks	48	12.9	+12.9
Conservative	Lucille Hagues	48	12.9	−22.2
Majority		61	16.4	
Turnout		372		
Independent hold		Swing		

Osbournby By-Election 24 April 2014
Party	Candidate	Votes	%	±%
Conservative	Kate Cook	312	49.7	+19.3
Lincolnshire Independent	Fay Cooper	269	42.8	+42.8
Labour	Robert Greetham	38	6.1	+6.1
Liberal Democrats	Tony Richardson	9	1.4	+1.4
Majority		43	6.8	
Turnout		628		
Conservative gain from Independent		Swing		

Sleaford Quarrington and Mareham By-Election 12 June 2014
Party	Candidate	Votes	%	±%
Lincolnshire Independent	Mark Suffield	527	44.6	+20.8
Conservative	Gary Titmus	477	40.4	+0.9
Independent	Nigel Gresham	178	15.1	+15.1
Majority		50	4.2	
Turnout		1,182		
Lincolnshire Independent gain from Independent		Swing		

Sleaford Westholme By-Election 12 June 2014
Party	Candidate	Votes	%	±%
Lincolnshire Independent	Steve Fields	342	68.5	+68.5
Conservative	Andrew Rayner	119	23.8	+3.3
Labour	Robert Greetham	38	7.6	+7.6
Majority		223	44.7	
Turnout		499		
Lincolnshire Independent gain from Independent		Swing		

=== 2015-2019 ===
North Hykeham Mill By-Election 30 July 2015
Party	Candidate	Votes	%	±%
Conservative	Mike Clarke	286	40.1	−19.2
Hykeham Independents	John Bishop	180	25.2	+25.2
Labour	Terence Dooley	161	22.6	+22.6
Green	Elizabeth Bathory-Porter	64	9.0	+9.0
Liberal Democrats	Diana Catton	22	3.1	+3.1
Majority		106	14.9	
Turnout		713		
Conservative gain from Lincolnshire Independent		Swing		

Ashby de la Launde and Cranwell By-Election 17 March 2016
Party	Candidate	Votes	%	±%
Lincolnshire Independent	Steve Clegg	457	55.6	+55.6
Conservative	Luke Mitchell	296	36.0	−31.3
Liberal Democrats	Clare Newton	69	8.4	+8.4
Majority		161	19.6	
Turnout		822		
Lincolnshire Independent gain from Conservative		Swing		

Cliff Villages By-Election 13 October 2016
Party	Candidate	Votes	%	±%
Lincolnshire Independent	Cat Mills	721	63.1	−1.0
Conservative	Daniel Gray	372	32.6	−3.3
Liberal Democrats	Aarron Smith	49	4.3	+4.3
Majority		349	30.6	
Turnout		1,142		
Lincolnshire Independent hold		Swing		

Ashby de la Launde and Cranwell By-Election 8 June 2017
Party	Candidate	Votes	%	±%
Conservative	Daniel Gray	1,638	58.7	−8.6
Lincolnshire Independent	Pearl Clarke	1,152	41.3	+41.3
Majority		486	17.4	
Turnout		2,790		
Conservative hold		Swing		

Heighington and Washingborough By-Election 8 June 2017
Party	Candidate	Votes	%	±%
Conservative	Edward Herring	2,703	66.0	−1.5
Liberal Democrats	Les Whitfield	1,393	34.0	+34.0
Majority		1,310	32.0	
Turnout		4,096		
Conservative hold		Swing		

Eagle, Swinderby and Witham St Hughs By-Election 22 February 2018
Party	Candidate	Votes	%	±%
Conservative	Peter Rothwell	563	57.8	N/A
Lincolnshire Independent	Nikki Dillon	347	35.6	N/A
Liberal Democrats	Corinne Byron	64	6.6	N/A
Majority		216	22.2	
Turnout		974		
Conservative gain from Independent		Swing		

Kirkby la Thorpe and South Kyme By-Election 24 May 2018
Party	Candidate	Votes	%	±%
Lincolnshire Independent	Mervyn Head	278	45.9	+10.4
Conservative	Dean Harlow	271	44.7	−19.8
Labour	James Thomas	30	5.0	+5.0
Liberal Democrats	Sue Hislop	27	4.5	+4.5
Majority		7	1.2	
Turnout		606		
Lincolnshire Independent gain from Conservative		Swing		

North Hykeham Mill By-Election 28 June 2018
Party	Candidate	Votes	%	±%
Conservative	Stephen Roe	376	49.7	−9.6
Lincolnshire Independent	Nikki Dillon	171	22.6	−18.1
Labour	Mark Reynolds	167	22.1	+22.1
Liberal Democrats	Corinne Byron	43	5.7	+5.7
Majority		205	27.1	
Turnout		757		
Conservative hold		Swing		

Skellingthorpe By-Election 28 June 2018
Party	Candidate	Votes	%	±%
Lincolnshire Independent	Richard Johnston	348	45.7	+45.7
Conservative	Nicola Clarke	201	26.4	−2.4
Labour	Matthew Newman	129	17.0	+17.0
Liberal Democrats	Tony Richardson	83	10.9	+3.9
Majority		147	19.3	
Turnout		761		
Lincolnshire Independent gain from Independent		Swing		

=== 2019-2023 ===
Billinghay, Martin and North Kyme By-Election 13 June 2019
Party	Candidate	Votes	%	±%
Conservative	Amanda Sanderson	320	48.4	N/A
Lincolnshire Independent	Tracy Giannisi	160	24.2	N/A
Independent	Robert Greetham	72	10.9	N/A
Liberal Democrats	Garry Winterton	57	8.6	N/A
Labour	Matt Newman	43	6.5	N/A
Independent	Steven Shanahan-Kluth	9	1.4	N/A
Majority		160	24.2	
Turnout		661		
Conservative gain from Lincolnshire Independent		Swing		

Bassingham and Brant Broughton By-Election 6 May 2021
Party	Candidate	Votes	%	±%
Conservative	Russell Eckert	721	45.3	+0.9
Lincolnshire Independent	Penelope Bauer	616	38.7	−16.9
Labour	Tom Wright	254	16.0	+16.0
Majority		105	6.6	
Turnout		1,591		
Conservative gain from Lincolnshire Independent		Swing		

Metheringham By-Election 11 November 2021
Party	Candidate	Votes	%	±%
Conservative	Fran Pembery	424		
Lincolnshire Independent	Ameila Bailey	404		
Conservative	Dave Parry	404		
Lincolnshire Independent	Mark Williams	369		
Labour	Paul Edwards-Shea	85		
Labour	Calvin Rodgerson	69		
Liberal Democrats	Diana Catton	29		
Conservative gain from Lincolnshire Independent		Swing		
Lincolnshire Independent hold		Swing		

The second seat was determined by the drawing of lots, with Ameila Bailey winning the draw.

Sleaford Castle By-Election 11 November 2021
Party	Candidate	Votes	%	±%
Conservative	Malcolm Offer	135	42.2	+10.2
Labour	Linda Edwards-Shea	93	29.1	−2.9
Independent	Steve Mason	49	15.3	+15.3
Independent	Ken Fernandes	22	6.9	+6.9
Liberal Democrats	Susan Hislop	21	6.6	+6.6
Majority		42	13.1	
Turnout		320		
Conservative gain from Lincolnshire Independent		Swing		

Sleaford Quarrington and Mareham By-Election 26 May 2022
Party	Candidate	Votes	%	±%
Lincolnshire Independent	Bob Oldershaw	545	39.8	+39.8
Conservative	Mark Smith	539	39.3	+5.9
Labour	Paul Edwards-Shea	287	20.9	−2.5
Majority		6	0.4	
Turnout		1,371		
Lincolnshire Independent gain from Conservative		Swing		

=== 2023-2027 ===
Billinghay Rural By-Election 14 December 2023
Party	Candidate	Votes	%	±%
Liberal Democrats	Adrian Whittle	354	41.1	
Conservative	Andy Wilkes	254	29.5	
Lincolnshire Independent	Wendy Liles	225	26.1	
Independent	Anthony Brand	29	3.4	
Majority		100	11.6	
Turnout		862		
Liberal Democrats gain from Conservative		Swing		

Heckington Rural By-Election 21 March 2024
Party	Candidate	Votes	%	±%
Conservative	Christine Collard	425	33.7	
Lincolnshire Independent	Dave Darmon	369	29.2	
Liberal Democrats	Susan Hislop	345	27.3	
Labour	Jennie Peacock	123	9.7	
Majority		56	4.4	
Turnout		1,262		
Conservative hold		Swing		

Bracebridge Heath By-Election 20 March 2025
Party	Candidate	Votes	%	±%
Conservative	Andy Wilkes	308	33.3	
Reform	Mark Nind	286	30.9	
Independent	Chris Barr	153	16.5	
Labour	Fumni Adeyemi	99	10.7	
Green	Christopher Rattigan-Smith	43	4.6	
Liberal Democrats	Stephen Chapman	36	3.9	
Majority		22	2.4	
Turnout		925		
Conservative hold		Swing		

Sleaford Westholme By-Election 12 March 2026
Party	Candidate	Votes	%	±%
Reform	Sandy Buchanan	243	45.1	
Lincolnshire Independent	Dave Darmon	87	16.1	
Conservative	Mark Webster	81	15.0	
Green	Ian Leach	55	10.2	
Independent	Anthony Brand	49	9.1	
Liberal Democrats	Susan Hislop	12	2.2	
Independent	Alex Tugwell	12	2.2	
Majority		156	28.9	
Turnout		539		
Reform gain from Lincolnshire Independent		Swing		
