= Lincolnshire Independents =

- Leader: Marianne Overton
- Founded: 18 July 2008; 17 years ago
- Registered: 19 December 2008
- Headquarters: Lincoln, Lincolnshire
- Ideology: Regionalism
- Lincolnshire County Council: 1 / 70
- House of Commons (Lincolnshire Seats): 0 / 7
- North Kesteven District Council: 8 / 43
- West Lindsey District Council: 2 / 36

Website
- www.lincolnshireindependents.org.uk

Lincolnshire Independents is a British political party based in the county of Lincolnshire. It was founded in July 2008 with the aim of re-aligning the "stagnant" politics of Lincolnshire, which had been largely dominated by the Conservative Party for decades.

== Local government ==
At the 2009 election, Lincolnshire Independents stood 19 candidates for Lincolnshire County Council of whom four were elected.

In 2013, they increased their representation to eight seats and polled 10.4% of the votes cast county-wide. However, academic Chris Game says they were "outsmarted" by the Conservatives, who formed a coalition with the Liberal Democrats and independents, including three from Lincolnshire Independents, a group led by Angela Newton - one getting a cabinet position. In 2014, leader Marianne Overton received an MBE for services to local government.

In the 2016 Police and Crime Commissioner elections the party stood a candidate for the Lincolnshire area, attaining 18,497 votes or approximately 16.52% of the vote.

At the 2017 county council election the party lost all but one of their seats on Lincolnshire County Council: party leader Marianne Overton won the Bassingham & Welbourn division.

At the 2019 North Kesteven District Council election, the Conservatives lost overall control as Lincolnshire Independents increased to 16 seats, alongside six more independents. The Conservatives lost eight seats, down to 20, but took one Cliff Villages seat from Lincolnshire Independents; Overton attributed the result to dissatisfaction with austerity: "local services seem to be disappearing into a huge pothole". It was part of a national trend, with over 600 gains by independents. The Conservatives and all independents together formed the administration, with Lincolnshire Independents holding one cabinet post.

In July 2021, Overton was found to have breached local government standards over a comment she made in her newsletter that said officials were "dodgy" for approving changes to planning subcommittees during the COVID-19 pandemic.

Overton retained her seat in the 2021 county council election.

The party also stood a candidate in the 2021 PCC election. He came third with 18,375 votes (10.7%).

Marianne Overton has been the Independent Group leader and a vice-chair on the Local Government Association since 2011.

Overton was elected unopposed in the 2023 North Kesteven District Council election, one of six unopposed candidates in North Kesteven, a pattern repeated across Lincolnshire.

Overton ran as the party's candidate in the 2025 Greater Lincolnshire mayoral election. She came fourth out of six candidates, with 8% of the vote. Her husband had challenged whether winner Andrea Jenkyns met the residency requirement. Overton was also reelected in the county council election held on the same day.

The loss in the March 2026 North Kesteven by-election of Sleaford Westholme to Reform was part of a national picture of losses by incumbent independents.

== Parliamentary elections ==
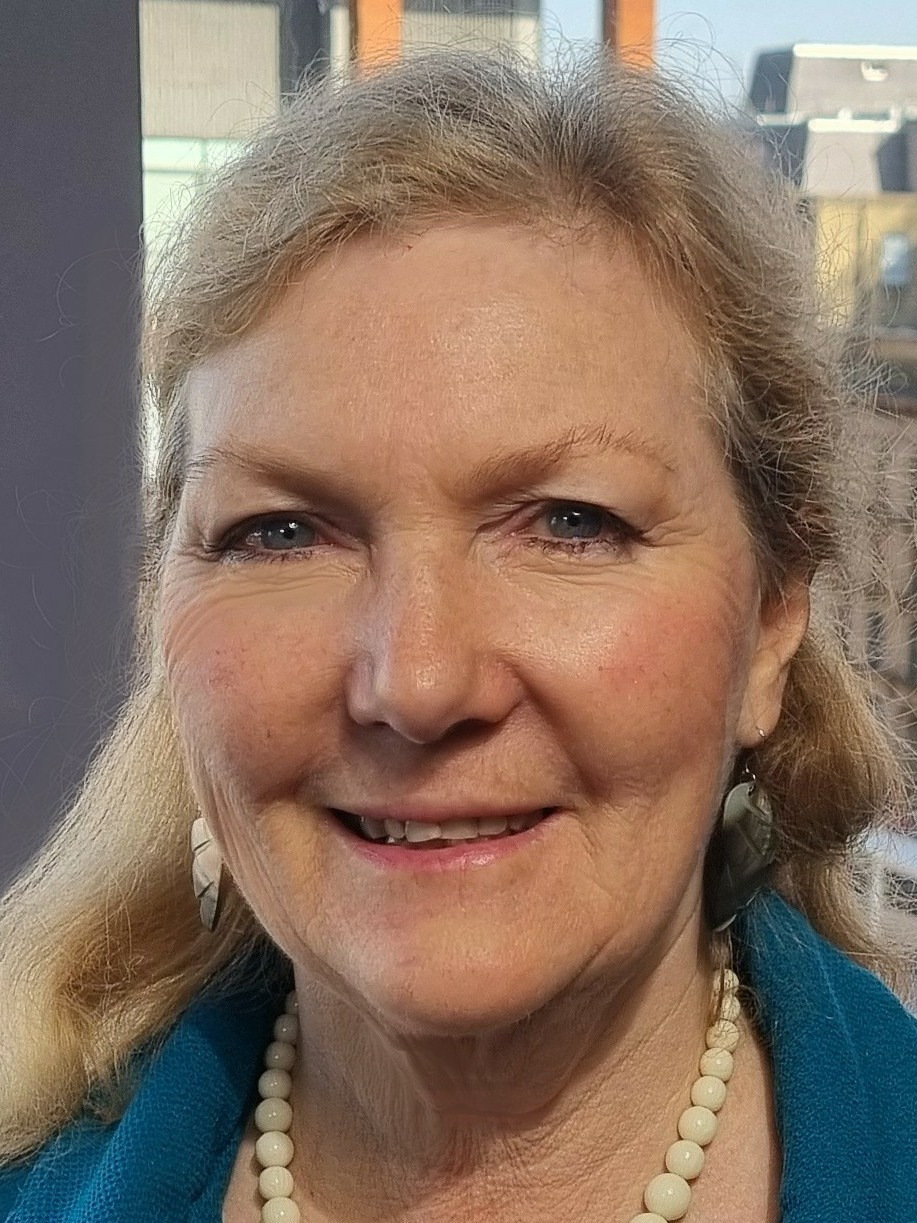
Leader Marianne Overton

At the 2010 general election, party leader Marianne Overton stood for Sleaford and North Hykeham. She came fourth with 3,806 votes (6.4%). Campaign director Mark Horn, a Conservative Party member for 23 years who resigned as a county councillor in 2008, stood in Grantham and Stamford, receiving 929 votes (1.8%). In Louth and Horncastle, Daniel Simpson gained 576 votes (1.1%).

At the 2015 general election, Overton stood again in Sleaford & North Hykeham, coming fifth with 3,233 votes (5.2%). Jan Hansen stood in Grantham and Stamford, receiving 724 votes (1.3%) and Simpson stood again in Louth and Horncastle, polling 659 votes (1.3%). Additionally, Chris Darcel stood in Gainsborough, where he polled 505 votes (1%), and Helen Powell stood in Lincoln, where she received 286 votes (0.6%).

Overton stood in Sleaford and North Hykeham for a third time in the December 2016 by-election. She came fifth, with 2,892 votes (8.8%), 472 behind Labour.

Overton again stood in Sleaford and North Hykeham in the 2019 general election, coming fourth with 3% of the vote.

The party ran in two constituencies in the 2024 general election: Grantham and Bourne, where they came seventh with 2.7% of the vote, and Sleaford and North Hykeham, where they came fourth with 6.2% of the vote.

== See also ==
- Boston Bypass Independents
- South Holland Independents
