= Robin Hunter-Clarke =

British politician (born 1992)

Councillor Robin Hunter-Clarke
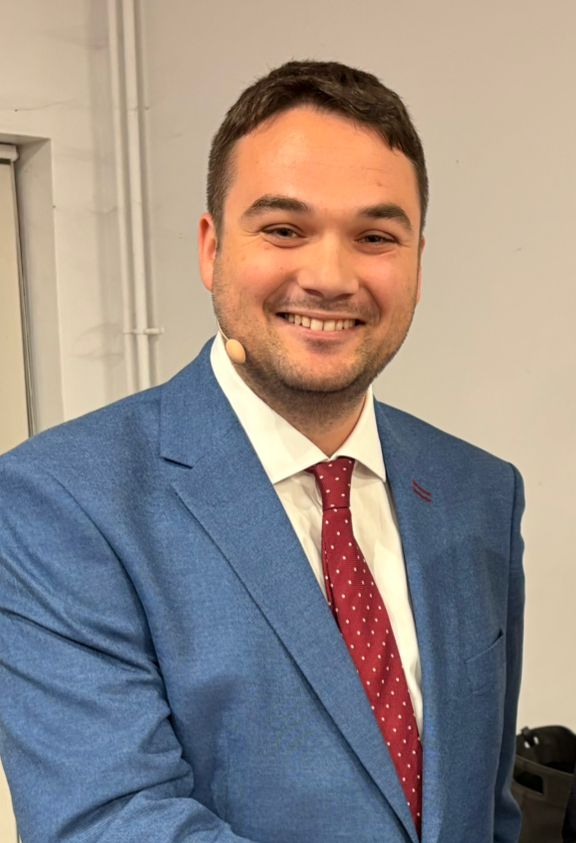

Deputy Leader of Norfolk County Council
- Incumbent
- Assumed office May 2026

Personal details
- Born: Boston, Lincolnshire, England, UK
- Party: Reform (2025–present)
- Other political affiliations: Conservative (2009–2012; 2022–2025); UKIP (2012–2018); Abolish (2021)
- Education: Skegness Grammar School, University of Chester
- Profession: Solicitor

Robin James Hunter-Clarke (born 1992/93) is a British Reform UK politician and solicitor. He is the Deputy Leader of Norfolk County Council, serving both as a district councillor and county councillor. He has stood as a candidate for election to Parliament, the Senedd and local councils. He was formerly Chief of Staff to Neil Hamilton and UKIP in the Senedd. He was an unsuccessful candidate in both the 2015 and 2017 general election and the 2021 Senedd election. He defected to Reform UK on 10 January 2025, saying he had given the Conservative Party "every opportunity to prove it could change".

Hunter-Clarke served as the national UKIP co-ordinator for Vote Leave, the official leave campaign during the European Union referendum.

He qualified as a solicitor of England and Wales on 16 February 2021.

== Political career ==
Hunter-Clarke began his political career at the age of 18, when he was elected as a town councillor in the May 2011 local elections. He was elected to Skegness Town Council, standing for the Conservative Party. He defected to the UK Independence Party (UKIP) in September 2012 at the party's national conference in Birmingham, making him the only UKIP member of Skegness town council.

In the May 2013 local elections, he was the UKIP candidate for the Skegness South Seat division of Lincolnshire County Council. He took the seat, beating the incumbent Conservative councillor, while his father Dean Hunter-Clarke won the Skegness North Seat for UKIP. Hunter-Clarke won the seat while a law student at the University of Chester.

Hunter-Clarke was elected onto UKIP's National Executive Committee in 2014. On 20 November 2014, Hunter-Clarke, then 22, was announced as UKIP's parliamentary candidate in the seat of Boston and Skegness. Being considered winnable, this was a key seat for the party, but Hunter-Clarke was ultimately defeated by The Daily Telegraph journalist Matt Warman. Hunter-Clarke achieved the second highest vote share for UKIP nationally; beaten only by UKIP's MP Douglas Carswell.

Following the general election, Hunter-Clarke became the national UKIP co-ordinator for the fledgling referendum campaign Vote Leave. This prompted UKIP to release a statement, as the party was currently backing neither Vote Leave nor Grassroots Out for the Electoral Commission's designation.

In 2016, he was an unsuccessful candidate in the council by-election for the Gibbonsdown ward in Wales, achieving 54 votes.

Together with fellow UKIP candidate Melanie Hunter-Clarke, he was also an unsuccessful candidate for councillor in the Welsh council ward of Llantwit Major in 2017, receiving 112 votes.

Hunter-Clarke was Neil Hamilton's agent for the 2016 National Assembly for Wales election. On Hamilton's election, he made Hunter-Clarke his personal chief of staff. After Hamilton was elected as the group leader, Hunter-Clarke became chief of staff for the group.

Hunter-Clarke announced his intention to stand in the 2016 Sleaford and North Hykeham by-election, a neighbouring seat to Boston & Skegness, but withdrew from the contest.

Hunter-Clarke stood as a candidate for UKIP in the 2017 General Election in the constituency of Pontypridd.

In June 2018 Hunter-Clarke was dismissed as the group's Chief of Staff in the National Assembly for Wales after Caroline Jones AM ousted Hamilton as the Leader of the UKIP Group. Hunter-Clarke consequently took Jones and the UKIP Assembly Members to an employment tribunal. At a preliminary hearing on 28 February 2019 the Assembly Commission, Michelle Brown AM and Caroline Jones AM failed in their applications to be removed as respondents in the case. The case continued, and a three-day preliminary hearing was listed to be heard in June 2019.

On 3, 4, and 5 June 2019 a three-day hearing took place in Pontypridd to determine who in fact employed Hunter-Clarke, as still no-one admitted to being his boss. On 4 June it was suggested that Hunter-Clarke had indeed not been dismissed and therefore was entitled to a year's back pay. Following the evidence heard Hunter-Clarke withdrew his claims against the National Assembly for Wales, Caroline Jones and the UKIP Group. This left Neil Hamilton as the sole respondent in the case. Hunter-Clarke's representative subsequently outlined that it was now clear 'Mr Hamilton was trying to make a political point at Mr Hunter-Clarke's expense'.

On 19 June 2019, Judge Moore ruled that Neil Hamilton was Hunter-Clarke's employer for the purposes of s230 of the Employment Rights Act 1996.

Hunter-Clarke stood as a candidate for the Abolish the Welsh Assembly Party at the 2021 Senedd election, receiving 660 votes in Ogmore. He also stood as a candidate on the South Wales West list, though the party polled just 3.8% of all votes cast.

Hunter-Clarke unsuccessfully contested the Dereham Withburga ward in the 2023 Breckland District Council election, receiving 305 votes; his affiliation was described as "Local Conservatives".

On 3 May 2024 Hunter-Clarke was elected as a Conservative councillor for the Hermitage Ward in a by-election for Breckland District Council, receiving 313 votes.

On 10 January 2025, Hunter-Clarke joined Reform UK during the party's 2025 South East England Conference.

On 7 May 2026, Hunter-Clarke was elected as a Reform UK councillor for the Dereham South Division for Norfolk County Council, receiving 1393 votes and 42% of the vote.
