= 2019 North Kesteven District Council election =

2019 UK local government election

- 2 May 2019
	First party	Second party	Third party
Party	Conservative	Lincolnshire Independent	Independent
Last election	28	8	6
Seats after	20 (Note: Includes by-election in Billinghay, Martin and North Kyme caused by an insufficient number of nominations.)	16	6
Seat change	▼8	▲8	Steady
Popular vote	18,816	15,230	4,252
Percentage	47%	38%	10%
	Fourth party	Fifth party
Party	Labour	Liberal Democrats
Last election	0	0
Seats after	0	0
Seat change	Steady	Steady
Popular vote	1,502	436
Percentage	3%	1%
- Map of the results of the election

The 2019 North Kesteven District Council election took place on 2 May 2019 to elect members of North Kesteven District Council in Lincolnshire, England. This was held on the same day as other local elections.

== Ward results ==
=== Ashby de la Launde and Cranwell ===
Ashby de la Launde and Cranwell
Party	Candidate	Votes	%	±%
Independent	Steve Clegg	934	71.1	
Lincolnshire Independent	Jim Clarke	747	56.9	
Conservative	Amanda Redsell	385	29.3	
Majority				
Turnout		1,324	33.8	
Rejected ballots		11	0.8	
Registered electors		3,915		
Independent gain from Conservative		Swing		
Lincolnshire Independent gain from Conservative		Swing		

The Lincolnshire Independents had gained a seat at a by-election on 17 March 2016.

=== Bassingham and Brant Broughton ===
Bassingham and Brant Broughton
Party	Candidate	Votes	%	±%
Lincolnshire Independent	Mary Green	783	52.7	
Lincolnshire Independent	Chris Spray	772	52.0	
Conservative	Pat Woodman	626	42.1	
Conservative	Sue Howe	586	39.4	
Majority				
Turnout		1,506	36.6	
Rejected ballots		20	1.3	
Registered electors		4,114		
Lincolnshire Independent gain from Conservative		Swing		
Lincolnshire Independent gain from Conservative		Swing		

=== Billinghay, Martin and North Kyme ===
Billinghay, Martin and North Kyme
Party	Candidate	Votes	%	±%
Conservative	Gill Ogden	Unopposed	N/A	
Majority				
Turnout		N/A	N/A	
Conservative hold		Swing		

A by-election was held on 13 June 2019 due to an insufficient number of nominations for the two seats, the result of which was a Conservative gain from the Lincolnshire Independents.

=== Bracebridge Heath and Waddington East ===
Bracebridge Heath and Waddington East
Party	Candidate	Votes	%	±%
Lincolnshire Independent	Jordan Moran	985	47.1	
Conservative	Peter Burley	940	44.9	
Conservative	Lindsey Cawrey	916	43.8	
Conservative	Mike Gallagher	901	43.1	
Lincolnshire Independent	John Kilcoyne	876	41.9	
Labour	Funmi Adeyemi	485	23.2	
Majority				
Turnout		2,110	28.9	
Rejected ballots		18	0.9	
Registered electors		7,287		
Lincolnshire Independent gain from Conservative		Swing		
Conservative hold		Swing		
Conservative hold		Swing		

=== Branston ===
Branston
Party	Candidate	Votes	%	±%
Lincolnshire Independent	Peter Lundgren	903	63.2	
Conservative	Ray Cucksey	641	44.9	
Lincolnshire Independent	Greg Tebb	603	42.2	
Conservative	Denise Penistan	358	25.1	
Majority				
Turnout		1,449	35.8	
Rejected ballots		20	1.4	
Registered electors		4,040		
Lincolnshire Independent hold		Swing		
Conservative hold		Swing		

=== Cliff Villages ===
Cliff Villages
Party	Candidate	Votes	%	±%
Lincolnshire Independent	Marianne Overton	1,467	82.1	
Conservative	Lucille Hagues	1,098	61.4	
Lincolnshire Independent	Kay Johnson	493	27.6	
Majority				
Turnout		1,804	41.1	
Rejected ballots		17	0.9	
Registered electors		4,369		
Lincolnshire Independent hold		Swing		
Conservative gain from Lincolnshire Independent		Swing		

=== Eagle, Swinderby and Witham St Hughs ===
Eagle, Swinderby and Witham St Hughs
Party	Candidate	Votes	%	±%
Lincolnshire Independent	Charles Overton	703	58.0	
Conservative	Sally Appleby	568	46.8	
Conservative	Peter Rothwell	525	43.3	
Majority				
Turnout		1,239	26.1	
Rejected ballots		26	2.1	
Registered electors		4,741		
Lincolnshire Independent gain from Independent		Swing		
Conservative hold		Swing		

=== Heckington Rural ===
Heckington Rural
Party	Candidate	Votes	%	±%
Conservative	Sally Tarry	914	64.2	
Conservative	Stewart Ogden	833	58.5	
Lincolnshire Independent	Michael Overton	570	40.1	
Majority				
Turnout		1,486	32.7	
Rejected ballots		63	4.2	
Registered electors		4,544		
Conservative hold		Swing		
Conservative hold		Swing		

=== Heighington and Washingborough ===
Heighington and Washingborough
Party	Candidate	Votes	%	±%
Lincolnshire Independent	Glenn Tinsley	1,259	67.7	
Conservative	Ian Carrington	886	47.7	
Conservative	Carola Goodwin	731	39.3	
Conservative	Dean Harlow	580	31.2	
Majority				
Turnout		1,955	34.5	
Rejected ballots		95	4.9	
Registered electors		5,667		
Lincolnshire Independent gain from Conservative		Swing		
Conservative hold		Swing		
Conservative hold		Swing		

=== Kirkby la Thorpe and South Kyme ===
Kirkby la Thorpe and South Kyme
Party	Candidate	Votes	%	±%
Lincolnshire Independent	Mervyn Head	634	83.4	
Independent	Robert Greetham	126	16.6	
Majority		508		
Turnout		767	38.6	
Rejected ballots		7	0.9	
Registered electors		1,985		
Lincolnshire Independent gain from Conservative		Swing		

The Lincolnshire Independents had gained the seat at a by-election on 24 May 2018.

=== Leasingham and Rauceby ===
Leasingham and Rauceby
Party	Candidate	Votes	%	±%
Conservative	Susan Waring	Unopposed	N/A	
Majority				
Turnout		N/A	N/A	
Conservative hold		Swing		

=== Metheringham ===
Metheringham
Party	Candidate	Votes	%	±%
Lincolnshire Independent	Nick Byatt	814	58.4	
Lincolnshire Independent	Laura Pearson	807	57.8	
Conservative	John Money	544	39.0	
Conservative	Mike Clarke	489	35.1	
Majority				
Turnout		1,410	32.9	
Rejected ballots		15	1.1	
Registered electors		4,273		
Lincolnshire Independent gain from Conservative		Swing		
Lincolnshire Independent gain from Conservative		Swing		

=== North Hykeham Forum ===
North Hykeham Forum
Party	Candidate	Votes	%	±%
Independent	Kay Gilliland	296	56.7	
Conservative	Paul Johnson	226	43.3	
Majority				
Turnout		529	29.4	
Rejected ballots		7	1.3	
Registered electors		1,800		
Independent gain from Hykeham Independents		Swing		

=== North Hykeham Memorial ===
North Hykeham Memorial
Party	Candidate	Votes	%	±%
Lincolnshire Independent	Nikki Dillon	417	66.7	
Conservative	Gary Edwards	208	33.3	
Majority				
Turnout		634	24.0	
Rejected ballots		9	1.4	
Registered electors		2,647		
Lincolnshire Independent gain from Independent		Swing		

=== North Hykeham Mill ===
North Hykeham Mill
Party	Candidate	Votes	%	±%
Conservative	Stephen Roe	561	64.0	
Conservative	Susannah Barker-Milan	478	54.6	
Liberal Democrats	Corinne Byron	332	37.9	
Majority				
Turnout		900	20	
Rejected ballots		24	2.7	
Registered electors		4,506		
Conservative hold		Swing		
Conservative gain from Lincolnshire Independent		Swing		

The Conservatives had gained a seat at a by-election on 30 July 2015.

=== North Hykeham Moor ===
North Hykeham Moor
Party	Candidate	Votes	%	±%
Conservative	Pam Whittaker	308	63.8	
No Description	George Tipler	175	36.2	
Majority				
Turnout		499	26.5	
Rejected ballots		16	3.2	
Registered electors		1,883		
Conservative hold		Swing		

=== North Hykeham Witham ===
North Hykeham Witham
Party	Candidate	Votes	%	±%
Conservative	Ross Little	Unopposed	N/A	
Majority				
Turnout		N/A	N/A	
Conservative hold		Swing		

=== Osbournby ===
Osbournby
Party	Candidate	Votes	%	±%
Lincolnshire Independent	Russell Jackson	471	60.2	
Conservative	Andrew Hagues	312	39.8	
Majority				
Turnout		797	40.2	
Rejected ballots		14	1.8	
Registered electors		1,976		
Lincolnshire Independent gain from Conservative		Swing		

=== Ruskington ===
Ruskington
Party	Candidate	Votes	%	±%
Conservative	Richard Wright	695	50.8	
Conservative	Terry Boston	654	47.8	
Lincolnshire Independent	Tracy Giannasi	643	47.0	
Lincolnshire Independent	Tom Head	495	36.2	
Majority				
Turnout		1,384	30.9	
Rejected ballots		16	1.2	
Registered electors		4,469		
Conservative hold		Swing		
Conservative hold		Swing		

=== Skellingthorpe ===
Skellingthorpe
Party	Candidate	Votes	%	±%
No Description	Christopher Goldson	757	75.0	
Lincolnshire Independent	Richard Johnston	332	32.9	
Independent	Robert Walshaw	306	30.3	
Conservative	Jennifer Gordon	229	22.7	
Liberal Democrats	Tony Richardson	104	10.3	
Majority				
Turnout		1,012	35.1	
Rejected ballots		2	0.2	
Registered electors		2,882		
No Description hold		Swing		
Lincolnshire Independent gain from Independent		Swing		

=== Sleaford Castle ===
Sleaford Castle
Party	Candidate	Votes	%	±%
Lincolnshire Independent	Cara Sandy	194	36.1	
Labour	Linda Edwards-Shea	172	32.0	
Conservative	Steve Fields	172	32.0	
Majority				
Turnout		555	25.8	
Rejected ballots		17	3.1	
Registered electors		2,148		
Lincolnshire Independent gain from Independent		Swing		

=== Sleaford Holdingham ===
Sleaford Holdingham
Party	Candidate	Votes	%	±%
Lincolnshire Independent	Robert Oates	253	45.3	
Independent	Ken Fernandes	114	20.4	
Conservative	Stephen Shanahan-Kluth	103	18.4	
Labour	Linda Lowndes	89	15.9	
Majority				
Turnout		562	23.6	
Rejected ballots		3	0.5	
Registered electors		2,381		
Lincolnshire Independent hold		Swing		

=== Sleaford Navigation ===
Sleaford Navigation
Party	Candidate	Votes	%	±%
Independent	David Suiter	274	47.2	
Conservative	Dan Gray	181	31.2	
Labour	Tarek Hayat	126	21.7	
Majority				
Turnout		593	29.7	
Rejected ballots		9	1.5	
Registered electors		1,997		
Independent hold		Swing		

=== Sleaford Quarrington and Mareham ===
Sleaford Quarrington and Mareham
Party	Candidate	Votes	%	±%
Independent	Bozena Allan	827	53.3	
Conservative	Mike Kent	640	41.2	
Conservative	Melody Shanahan-Kluth	614	39.6	
Conservative	Tim Conning	581	37.4	
Labour	Paul Edwards-Shea	447	28.8	
Majority				
Turnout		1,567	27.0	
Rejected ballots		15	1.0	
Registered electors		5,799		
Independent gain from Lincolnshire Independent		Swing		
Conservative hold		Swing		
Conservative hold		Swing		

=== Sleaford Westholme ===
Sleaford Westholme
Party	Candidate	Votes	%	±%
Independent	Anthony Brand	239	54.0	
Independent	Heather Lorimer	204	46.0	
Majority				
Turnout		454	24.4	
Rejected ballots		11	2.4	
Registered electors		1,860		
Independent gain from Lincolnshire Independent		Swing		

=== Waddington West ===
Waddington West
Party	Candidate	Votes	%	±%
Conservative	Lance Pennell	333	64.6	+3.8
Labour	Matt Newman	183	35.5	+35.5
Majority		150		
Turnout		551	27.2	
Rejected ballots		35	6.4	
Registered electors		2,022		
Conservative hold		Swing		

== Changes 2019–2023 ==
=== By-elections ===
==== Billinghay, Martin and North Kyme ====
A by-election was held in Billinghay, Martin and North Kyme on 13 June 2019. This was because only one candidate had been nominated for the 2-member ward at the May elections, leaving a vacancy to be filled.

Billinghay, Martin and North Kyme: 13 June 2019
Party	Candidate	Votes	%	±%
Conservative	Amanda Sanderson	320	48.3	
Lincolnshire Independent	Tracy Giannasi	160	24.2	
Independent	Robert Greetham	73	11.0	
Liberal Democrats	Garry Winterton	57	8.6	
Labour	Matt Newman	43	6.5	
Independent	Stephen Shanahan-Kluth	9	1.4	
Majority				
Turnout		668	16.0	
Rejected ballots		6	0.9	
Registered electors		4,184		
Conservative gain from Lincolnshire Independent		Swing		

==== Bassingham and Brant Broughton ====
A by-election was held on 6 May 2021 after Lincolnshire Independents councillor Chris Spray resigned in November 2020. The Conservatives gained the seat.

Bassingham and Brant Broughton: 6 May 2021
Party	Candidate	Votes	%	±%
Conservative	Russell Eckert	721	45.3	
Lincolnshire Independent	Penelope Bauer	616	38.7	
Labour	Tom Wright	254	16.0	
Majority		105	6.6	
Turnout		1,599	37.9	
Rejected ballots		8	0.5	
Registered electors		4,219		
Conservative gain from Lincolnshire Independent				

==== Metheringham ====
Metheringham: 11 November 2021
Party	Candidate	Votes	%	±%
Conservative	Fran Pembery	424	46.1	
Lincolnshire Independent	Amelia Bailey	404	43.9	
Conservative	Dave Parry	404	43.9	
Lincolnshire Independent	Mark Williams	369	40.1	
Labour	Paul Edwards-Shea	85	9.2	
Labour	Calvin Rodgerson	69	7.5	
Liberal Democrats	Diana Catton	29	3.2	
Turnout		920	21.3	
Rejected ballots		2	0.2	
Registered electors		4,313		
Conservative gain from Lincolnshire Independent				
Lincolnshire Independent hold				

Amelia Bailey and Dave Parry tied on 404 votes and lots were drawn, with Bailey declared elected. The Metheringham by-elections were triggered by the resignations of the previous Lincolnshire Independents councillors Nick Byatt and Laura Pearson.

==== Sleaford Castle ====
Sleaford Castle: 11 November 2021
Party	Candidate	Votes	%	±%
Conservative	Malcolm Offer	135	42.2	+10.2
Labour	Linda Edwards-Shea	93	29.1	−2.9
Independent	Steve Mason	49	15.3	N/A
Independent	Ken Fernandes	22	6.9	N/A
Liberal Democrats	Susan Hislop	21	6.6	N/A
Majority		42	13.1	
Turnout		323	14.7	
Rejected ballots		3	0.9	
Registered electors		2,205		
Conservative gain from Lincolnshire Independent		Swing	▲6.6	

The Sleaford Castle by-election was triggered by the resignation of Lincolnshire Independents councillor Cara Sandy.

==== Sleaford Quarrington and Mareham ====
A by-election was held on 26 May 2022 after Conservative councillor Mike Kent resigned as he was moving away from the area. The Lincolnshire Independents gained the seat.

Sleaford Quarrington and Mareham: 26 May 2022
Party	Candidate	Votes	%	±%
Lincolnshire Independent	Bob Oldershaw	545	39.8	
Conservative	Mark Smith	539	39.3	
Labour	Paul Edwards-Shea	287	20.9	
Majority		6	0.4	
Turnout		1,376	22.9	
Rejected ballots		5	0.4	
Registered electors		6,020		
Lincolnshire Independent gain from Conservative				
