= 2013 Lincolnshire County Council election =

2013 UK local government election

← 2009	2 May 2013	2017 →

All 77 seats to Lincolnshire County Council 39 seats needed for a majority
	First party	Second party	Third party
Party	Conservative	UKIP	Labour
Seats won	36	16	12
Seat change	▼24	▲16	▲8
	Fourth party	Fifth party
Party	Lincolnshire Independent	Liberal Democrats
Seats won	8	3
Seat change	▲4	▼2
- Map showing the results of the 2013 Lincolnshire County Council elections.
Council control before election
Conservative
Council control after election
No Overall Control

An election to Lincolnshire County Council took place on 2 May 2013 as part of the 2013 United Kingdom local elections. 77 electoral divisions returned one county councillor each by first-past-the-post voting for a four-year term of office. The electoral divisions were the same as those used at the previous election in 2009. No elections were held in North Lincolnshire or North East Lincolnshire, which are unitary authorities outside the area covered by the County Council.

All locally registered electors (British, Irish, Commonwealth and European Union citizens) who were aged 18 or over on Thursday 2 May 2013 were entitled to vote in the local elections. Those who were temporarily away from their ordinary address (for example, away working, on holiday, in student accommodation or in hospital) were also entitled to vote in the local elections, although those who had moved abroad and registered as overseas electors cannot vote in the local elections. It is possible to register to vote at more than one address (such as a university student who had a term-time address and lives at home during holidays) at the discretion of the local Electoral Register Office, but it remains an offence to vote more than once in the same local government election.

== Summary ==
The election saw the Conservative Party lose overall control of the council. The party previously enjoyed a sizable majority, holding around three quarters of the seats. After the election, the Conservatives found themselves 6 seats short of an overall majority; the UK Independence Party was the council's second biggest party, with 16 seats. The Conservative group negotiated a coalition deal with the Liberal Democrats, whereby there was one Liberal Democrat cabinet member. UKIP replaced the Liberal Democrats as the council's official opposition.

UKIP lost six of its councillors to defections shortly after the election, and as a result Labour became the official opposition.

== Results ==
Lincolnshire County Council election, 2013
Party	Seats	Gains	Losses	Net gain/loss	Seats %	Votes %	Votes	+/−
Conservative	36	1	26	−25	46.75	35.75	58,119	−29,645
UKIP	16	16	0	+16	20.78	24.17	39,289	+33,681
Labour	12	7	0	+7	15.58	18.40	29,919	+9,720
Lincolnshire Independent	8	5	0	+5	10.39	11.34	18,428	+794
Liberal Democrats	3	0	2	−2	3.90	4.36	7,093	−29,392
Independent	2	1	0	+1	2.60	5.43	8,831	−1,110
BNP	0	0	0	0	0.00	0.27	435	−6,109
TUSC	0	0	0	0	0.00	0.20	323	New
Green	0	0	0	0	0.00	0.08	136	−974
English People's Party	0	0	0	0	0.00			

== Results by electoral division ==
=== Boston ===
==== Boston Coastal ====
Boston Coastal
Party	Candidate	Votes	%	±%
UKIP	Felicity Ransome	826	45.7	20.5
Conservative	Peter Bedford	730	40.4	−14.6
Labour	Paul Gleeson	249	13.8	4.1
Turnout		1,808	31.2	
UKIP gain from Conservative		Swing		

==== Boston East ====
Boston East
Party	Candidate	Votes	%	±%
UKIP	Sue Ransom	675	40.9	40.9
Labour	Paul Kenny	336	20.4	−3.5
Conservative	Mike Gilbert	313	19.0	−18.8
Independent	Anne Dorrian	164	9.9	9.9
Lincolnshire Independent	Richard Dungworth	156	9.5	9.5
Turnout		1,649	24.7	
UKIP gain from Conservative		Swing		

==== Boston Fishtoft ====
Boston Fishtoft
Party	Candidate	Votes	%	±%
UKIP	Elizabeth Ransome	837	35.1	35.1
Independent	Ossy Snell	736	30.9	30.9
Conservative	Raymond Singleton-McGuire	606	25.4	−25.5
Labour	Mike Sheridan-Shinn	197	8.3	−1.5
Turnout		2,383	31.1	
UKIP gain from Conservative		Swing		

==== Boston North West ====
Boston North West
Party	Candidate	Votes	%	±%
UKIP	Tiggs Keywood-Wainwright	708	43.6	43.6
Conservative	Andrea Jenkyns	378	23.3	−2.2
Labour	Paul Goodale	285	17.5	6.2
Independent	Carol Ann Taylor	248	15.3	15.3
Turnout		1,624	23.3	
UKIP gain from Conservative		Swing		

==== Boston Rural ====
Boston Rural
Party	Candidate	Votes	%	±%
Conservative	Michael Brookes	1,163	45.5	10.6
UKIP	Jodie Sutton	1,050	41.1	19.0
Labour	Norman Hart	336	13.2	5.2
Turnout		2,554	27.9	
Conservative hold		Swing		

==== Boston South ====
Boston South
Party	Candidate	Votes	%	±%
Lincolnshire Independent	Alison Austin	889	42.7	42.7
UKIP	Don Ransome	786	37.7	15.8
Conservative	Paul Skinner	310	14.9	−21.8
Labour	Jan Finch	92	4.4	−2.8
Turnout		2,083	33.3	
Lincolnshire Independent gain from Conservative		Swing		

==== Boston West ====
Boston West
Party	Candidate	Votes	%	±%
UKIP	Bob McAuley	806	44.6	26.2
Conservative	Yvonne Gunter	344	19.0	−7.7
Lincolnshire Independent	Robert Lauberts	338	18.7	18.7
Labour	Pam Kenny	310	17.2	17.2
Turnout		1,806	30.2	
UKIP gain from Boston Bypass Independents		Swing		

=== East Lindsey ===
==== Alford and Sutton ====
Alford and Sutton
Party	Candidate	Votes	%	±%
Lincolnshire Independent	Steve Palmer	872	34.9	34.9
Conservative	Graham Marsh	813	32.6	−11.4
UKIP	Luke Thompson	498	20.0	20.0
Labour	Fiona Brown	301	12.1	3.7
Turnout		2,495	34	
Lincolnshire Independent gain from Conservative		Swing		

==== Horncastle and Tetford ====
Horncastle and Tetford
Party	Candidate	Votes	%	±%
Lincolnshire Independent	Aron Bill	1,378	44.3	8.6
Conservative	William Grover	690	22.2	−13.4
UKIP	Neil Parnham	642	20.6	20.6
Labour	Janet Lister	208	6.7	−0.1
Independent	Richard Barker	188	6.0	6.0
Turnout		3,109	38	
Lincolnshire Independent hold		Swing		

==== Ingoldmells Rural ====
Ingoldmells Rural
Party	Candidate	Votes	%	±%
Conservative	Colin Davie	1,364	52.0	3.4
Labour	Graham Archer	779	29.7	16.2
Independent	Giles Crust	459	17.5	−9.5
Turnout		2,622	35	
Conservative hold		Swing		

==== Louth Marsh ====
Louth Marsh
Party	Candidate	Votes	%	±%
UKIP	Daniel McNally	976	38.2	38.2
Conservative	Robert Palmer	784	30.7	−34.5
Independent	Terry Knowles	519	20.3	20.3
Labour	Stuart Jameson	269	10.5	0.3
Turnout		2,555	38	
UKIP gain from Conservative		Swing		

==== Louth North ====
Louth North
Party	Candidate	Votes	%	±%
Labour	Sarah Dodds	857	46.7	32.3
Conservative	Pauline Watson	534	29.1	−22.8
UKIP	Mike Beecham	278	15.1	15.1
Lincolnshire Independent	Daniel Simpson	118	6.4	6.4
Liberal Democrats	Dave Dobbie	42	2.3	−18.3
Turnout		1,835	34	
Labour gain from Conservative		Swing		

==== Louth Rural North ====
Louth Rural North
Party	Candidate	Votes	%	±%
Conservative	Tony Bridges	783	40.8	−22.7
Lincolnshire Independent	Edward Mossop	555	28.9	28.9
Labour	Laura Stephenson	298	15.5	4.7
Independent	Jean Johnson	273	14.2	14.2
Turnout		1,919	30	
Conservative hold		Swing		

==== Louth South ====
Louth South
Party	Candidate	Votes	%	±%
Labour	John Hough	1,002	40.5	4.5
Independent	Jill Makinson-Sanders	651	26.3	26.3
UKIP	David Axton	424	17.1	17.1
Conservative	Daniel Turner	390	15.8	−12.0
Turnout		2,473	34	
Labour hold		Swing		

==== Louth Wolds ====
Louth Wolds
Party	Candidate	Votes	%	±%
Conservative	Hugo Marfleet	1,193	53.4	5.7
Lincolnshire Independent	Brian Burnett	586	26.2	0.1
Labour	Michael Preen	273	12.2	7.0
BNP	John Atty	176	7.9	2.9
Turnout		2,236	36	
Conservative hold		Swing		

==== Mablethorpe ====
Mablethorpe
Party	Candidate	Votes	%	±%
UKIP	Anne Reynolds	802	33.6	33.6
Labour	Tony Howard	767	32.1	5.5
Lincolnshire Independent	Terence Brown	414	17.3	−13.5
Conservative	Graham Gooding	401	16.8	−16.0
Turnout		2,388	38	
UKIP gain from Conservative		Swing		

==== Skegness North ====
Skegness North
Party	Candidate	Votes	%	±%
UKIP	Dean Hunter-Clark	843	41.3	18.6
Labour	Brenda Futers	632	31.0	2.2
Conservative	Mark Smith	561	27.5	−7.3
Turnout		2,042	29	
UKIP gain from Conservative		Swing		

==== Skegness South ====
Skegness South
Party	Candidate	Votes	%	±%
UKIP	Robin Hunter-Clarke	633	35.5	15.2
Conservative	Ken Milner	583	32.7	−4.3
Labour	Danny Brookes	483	27.1	9.6
BNP	Robert Ashton	77	4.3	4.3
Turnout		1,782	28	
UKIP gain from Conservative		Swing		

=== West Lindsey ===
==== Ancholme Cliff ====
Ancholme Cliff
Party	Candidate	Votes	%	±%
Conservative	Charles Strange	1,142	55.0	
UKIP	Nigel Wright	582	28.0	
Liberal Democrats	Carol Skye	180	8.7	
Labour	Thornton Moore	174	8.4	
Turnout		2,078	32	
Conservative hold		Swing		
