= 2009 Lincolnshire County Council election =

2009 UK local government election

← 2005	4 June 2009	2013 →

All 77 seats to Lincolnshire County Council 39 seats needed for a majority
	First party	Second party
Party	Conservative	Liberal Democrats
Last election	45	8
Seats won	60	5
Seat change	▲15	▼3
Popular vote	87,764	36,485
Percentage	47	19.4
	Third party	Fourth party
Party	Labour	Lincolnshire Independent
Last election	21	0
Seats won	4	4
Seat change	▼17	▲4
Popular vote	20,199	17,634
Percentage	10.8	9.4
- Map of the results of the election coloured by victorious party
Leader before election
Conservative
Elected Leader
Conservative

Elections to Lincolnshire County Council took place on 4 June 2009 as part of the 2009 United Kingdom local elections, having been delayed from 7 May, in order to coincide with elections to the European Parliament. 77 councillors were elected, each electoral division returned either one or two county councillors by first-past-the-post voting for a four-year term of office. The electoral divisions were the same as those used at the previous election in 2005.

All locally registered electors (British, Irish, Commonwealth and European Union citizens) who were aged 18 or over on Thursday 4 June 2009 were entitled to vote in the local elections. Those who were temporarily away from their ordinary address (for example, away working, on holiday, in student accommodation or in hospital) were also entitled to vote in the local elections, although those who had moved abroad and registered as overseas electors cannot vote in the local elections. It is possible to register to vote at more than one address (such as a university student who had a term-time address and lives at home during holidays) at the discretion of the local Electoral Register Office, but it remains an offence to vote more than once in the same local government election.

== Results ==
Lincolnshire County Council election, 2009
Party	Seats	Gains	Losses	Net gain/loss	Seats %	Votes %	Votes	+/−
Conservative	60			+15	78	47	87,764	+15
Liberal Democrats	5				10.4	19.4	36,485	-3
Labour	4	0	17	-17	5.2	10.8	20,199	-17
Lincolnshire Independent	4				5.2	9.4	17,634	
Independent	3				3.9	5.3	9,947	
Boston Bypass Independents	1				1.3	1	1,935	
BNP	0	0	0	0	0	3.5	6,544	
UKIP	0	0	0	0	0	3	5,608	
Green	0	0	0	0	0	0.6	1,110	
"No Political Affiliation"	0	0	0	0	0	0.24	439	

Electoral Division	Sitting	Candidate	Party	Votes	Total Votes	Majority	Turnout	Electorate
Alford and Sutton	→	MARSH, Graham Anthony	Conservative	1218	2767	237	36.6%	7567
		DEVEREAUX, Sarah	Independent	981
		PARKHURST, Helen	Liberal Democrat	336
		TAYLOR, Joyce Sylvia	Labour	232
Ancholme Cliff	→	STRANGE, Lewis	Conservative	1691	2436	946	39%	6248
		HEATHORN, Andrew Hewson	Liberal Democrat	745
Bardney and Cherry Willingham	→	FLEETWOOD, Ian Gordon	Conservative	1443	2818	873	40.5%	6954
		PEARSON, Carol	UK Independence Party	570
		TREVOR, Stephen Robert	Liberal Democrat	548
		TOINTON, Melanie Louisa	Labour	257
Bassingham Rural	→	PHILLIPS, Raymond John	Conservative	1460	3296	371	39.4%	8374
		BAKER, David Antony	Liberal Democrat	1089
		DILKS, John Michael	UK Independence Party	550
		ROPSON, Elizabeth Ann	Labour	197
Billinghay and Metheringham	→	BRADWELL, Patricia	Conservative	1737	2162	1312	32.9%	6578
		WOODS, Mike	Labour	425
Boston Coastal	→	BEDFORD, Peter	Conservative	1142	2075	619	36.4%	5696
		RANSOME, Felicity Elizabeth Ellen	UK Independence Party	523
		TURNER, Anthony	British National Party	208
		GALL, Beth	Labour	202
Boston East		GILBERT, Mike	Conservative	674	1783	248	27.8%	6404
		KENNY, Paul Robert	Labour	426
		CLARE, Gerry	Boston Bypass Ind	406
		SHERIDAN-SHINN, Mike	Liberal Democrat	277
Boston Fishtoft		SINGLETON-MCGUIRE, Raymond Brian	Conservative	1435	2818	329	36.9%	7643
	→	SNELL, Ossy	Liberal Democrat	1106
		GALL, Mick	Labour	277
Boston North West		Andrea Jenkyns	Conservative	463	1816	89	26.9%	6746
		WESTCOTT, Colin	British National Party	374
		AUSTIN, Alison Mary	Boston Bypass Ind	283
		LEGGOTT, Richard Francis	Independent 2	279
		KENNY, Pam	Labour	205
		APPLEBY, Paul James	Liberal Democrat	130
	→	BAKEWELL, Andrew Martin	Independent	82
Boston Rural		BROOKES, Michael	Independent	1096	3135	2	34.7%	9038
		WINDER, James Edward Keith	Conservative	1094
		SUTTON, Jodie Louise	UK Independence Party	694
		LEONARD, Liz	Labour	251
Boston South		SKINNER, Paul Anthony	Conservative	772	2105	51	34.4%	6123
	→	AUSTIN, Richard William	Boston Bypass Ind	721
		RANSOME, Sue	UK Independence Party	461
		HART, Norman Alan	Labour	151
Boston West		NEWELL, Ray	Boston Bypass Ind	525	1922	11	34%	5646
		MOULD, Paul Frederick	Conservative	514
		RANSOME, Elizabeth Lucy Claire	UK Independence Party	353
	→	GOODALE, Paul Jonathan	Labour	297
		OWENS, David	British National Party	233
Bourne Abbey	→	WOOLLEY, Sue	Conservative	1298	2807	536	33.6%	8342
		HOLMES, Trevor	Independent	762
		MORRIS, Peter	Liberal Democrat	289
		BRITTON, Roberta May	Labour	239
		GALLAND, Alan Winston	British National Party	219
Bourne Castle	→	FARQUHARSON, Charlotte Margaret Herschel*	Conservative	1343	2620	299	40.7%	6440
		POWELL, Helen Nunziatina Joan	Lincolnshire Independents	1044
		MANSOUR, Ann Elizabeth	Labour	233
Bracebridge Heath and Waddington	→	TALBOT, Christine-Anne	Conservative	1599	2751	858	32.2%	8532
		RICHARDSON, Tony	Liberal Democrat	741
		WHITNEY, Thomas	Labour	411
Branston and Navenby	→	OVERTON, Marianne	Lincolnshire Independents	2030	3131	1285	40.7%	7686
		FROST, Joyce Morag	Conservative	745
		MCALL, Jacqueline, Anne	Liberal Democrat	179
		HANGER, John Frederick	Labour	177
Colsterworth Rural	→	CHAPMAN, Edward Roy	Conservative	1323	2085	807	38.9%	5360
		HANDFORD, Owen James	Liberal Democrat	516
		BANKS, Anthony Newton	Labour	246
Crowland and Whaplode	→	PRZYSZLAK, Paul Silvester	Conservative	1523	2285	1031	33.1%	6908
		TANNER, Kathleen Mary	Liberal Democrat	492
		CLARKE, Stephen John	Labour	270
Deeping St James		EXTON, Mike	Conservative	846	1906	250	34.8%	5475
		HAMMERSLEY, Philip Edward	Liberal Democrat	596
		BOSSINGHAM, Michael Edward	Green Party	464
Donington Rural	→	PUTTICK, Amanda	Conservative	1769	2463	1333	36.1%	6820
		BISNAUTHSING, Teelesh	Liberal Democrat	436
		ROBERTS, Christine	Labour	258
Folkingham Rural	→	HILL, Martin John	Conservative	1928	3364	1431	44.5%	7552
		MORRIS, Janire	Liberal Democrat	497
		BRADLEY, Timothy Charles	Lincolnshire Independents	387
		ROBINSON, Chris	British National Party	301
		BURLING, David Aaron	Labour	251
Gainsborough Hill	→	TINKER, Mick	Liberal Democrat	593	1436	214	22.7%	6320
		JOHNSON, Thomas Gordon	UK Independence Party	379
		MILNE, Jessie Brenda	Conservative	332
		RADFORD, Peter	Labour	132
Gainsborough Rural South		KINCH, Stuart Francis	Conservative	1785	3678	271	44%	8367
	→	HEATH, Peter James	Liberal Democrat	1514
		PORTER, Malcolm Douglas	British National Party	379
Gainsborough Trent	→	O'CONNOR, Pat	Liberal Democrat	1301	1796	806	23.6%	7600
		DAVIES, Timothy Mark	Conservative	495
Grantham Barrowby		BOSWORTH, Pam	Conservative	761	1849	250	28.5%	6489
		MCBRIDE, Stuart	Lincolnshire Independents	511
	→	DAVIDSON, Alan	Labour	324
		FINCH, Simon Howard	Liberal Democrat	253
Grantham East		CARPENTER, Paul Antony	Conservative	1009	2475	379	29.6%	8374
		WELLS, Bruce Victor	Lincolnshire Independents	630
		SELBY, Ian Edward	Labour	548
		BISNAUTHSING, Pamela Joan	Liberal Democrat	288
Grantham North		WOOTTEN, Ray	Conservative	1446	2897	982	39.6%	7319
		HEARMON, Rob	Lincolnshire Independents	464
		SHARP, Jane	Liberal Democrat	369
		ANDREWS, John David	Independent	333
		JACKLIN, Paul Brian	Labour	285
Grantham North West		DAVIES, Richard Graham	Conservative	1150	2231	657	35.8%	6226
		TODD, Alwyn	Lincolnshire Independents	493
		JACKSON, Robert Allan	Liberal Democrat	353
		HURST, Fereshteh	Labour	235
Grantham South		STOKES, Adam Neil	Conservative	1080	2262	366	29.4%	7700
		COX, Nicola	Liberal Democrat	714
	→	HURST, John	Labour	468
Heighington and Washingborough	→	OXBY, Ron	Conservative	1105	2130	448	39.1%	5441
		WOODRUFF, Hannah	Lincolnshire Independents	657
		SCOTT, Peter	Labour	202
		BALDOCK, Ashley Hugh	British National Party	166
Holbeach		WORTH, Nick	Conservative	1599	2523	1181	33.8%	7459
		DREW, Carol Ann	British National Party	418
		GRIFFITHS, Robert	Liberal Democrat	294
		DAWSON, Dorothy Annie	Labour	212
Holbeach Rural	→	WEBB, William Scrimshaw	Conservative	2052	2842	1262	37.6%	7553
		JOYNSON, Kenneth Mercer	Liberal Democrat	790
Horncastle and Tetford		ARON, William James	Lincolnshire Independents	1159	3251	2	39%	8341
	→	CLARKE, Michael Brian	Conservative	1157
		SHEPHARD, Ian	Liberal Democrat	450
		DREW, Jeffrey	British National Party	265
		COLLETT, Barbara Mary	Labour	220
Hough	→	FARRAR, Chris	Conservative	1488	3413	157	46.7%	7301
		WOOD, Paul	Lincolnshire Independents	1331
		BROUGH, Christine Norah	Liberal Democrat	347
		BURTON, Mick	Labour	247
Hykeham Forum	→	MARRIOTT, John Rawdon	Liberal Democrat	974	2263	342	39.4%	5747
		POOLE, Reg	Conservative	632
		REEVES, Diana Mary	UK Independence Party	325
		NANNESTAD, Donald James	Labour	172
		BUXTON, Patricia Mary	British National Party	160
Ingoldmells Rural	→	DAVIE, Colin John	Conservative	1352	2784	600	36.4%	7644
		CRUST, Giles Allen	Independent	752
		CARPENTER, James Anthony	Labour	376
		DAW, Irene Vivian	Liberal Democrat	304
Lincoln Birchwood		STRENGIEL, Edmund Walter	Conservative	844	1855	412	30.6%	6056
		ULYAT, Tina Iris	Labour	432
		GUNN, Lindsay-Grace	Liberal Democrat	313
		MARSHALL, Philip Adam	British National Party	266
Lincoln Boultham		CLARKE, Kevin John	Labour	726	1974	51	32.4%	6084
	→	CAWREY, Lindsey Ann	Conservative	675
		PEPPER, Lynn Joan	Liberal Democrat	340
		GALLAND, Marion	British National Party	233
Lincoln Bracebridge		HUBBARD, Rachel Louise	Conservative	1076	2190	403	34.5%	6345
	→	ROBINSON, Bud Roy	Labour	673
		DOBBIE, David Paul	Liberal Democrat	441
Lincoln East		CLIFF, Sara Patricia	Conservative	713	1827	86	29.6%	6173
	→	RENSHAW, Robin Anthony	Labour	627
		CULLEN, Ryan Thomas	Liberal Democrat	487
Lincoln Glebe		MATHERS, Pauline Ann	Conservative	844	1957	365	29.3%	6668
		MURRAY, Neil McElhinney	Labour	479
		PARKER, Simon Jeremy	Liberal Democrat	372
		WOLVERSON, Olivia Paulette	British National Party	262
Lincoln Hartsholme		HILLS, Ronald	Conservative	1176	2182	647	32.1%	6793
		CHARTERS, James Jopson	Liberal Democrat	529
		BILTON, Jonathan James Arthur	Labour	477
Lincoln Moorland		SMITH, Kelly Jason	Conservative	817	1874	275	32.3%	5804
	→	ELLIS, Geoffrey John	Labour	542
		SHAW, Jenny Helen	Liberal Democrat	293
		KIRK, Alan James	British National Party	222
Lincoln North		WILLIAMS, Alister Paul	Conservative	968	2353	132	31.4%	7495
	→	BURKE, Leslie Christopher	Labour	836
		SMITH, Kristan Jorge	Liberal Democrat	549
Lincoln Park	→	JACKSON, Neville Ian	Labour	441	1286	46	26%	4954
		METCALFE, Claire Patricia	Conservative	395
		CULLEN, Heather Elizabeth	Liberal Democrat	326
		GLASSCOE, Marc Christopher	Socialist Alternative (Save Our Services)	124
Lincoln West	→	PARKER, Robert Bernard	Labour	1030	2668	161	33.3%	8001
		SHAW, Charles William	Liberal Democrat	869
		DAVIDSON, Margaret Winifred	Conservative	769
Louth Marsh	→	PALMER, Robert John	Conservative	1731	2653	1080	39%	6807
		MORGAN, Moira Jessie	Liberal Democrat	651
		JACKSON, Peter	Labour	271
Louth North	→	WATSON, Pauline Frances	Conservative	963	1855	580	34%	5463
		FOX, Alan Francis	Liberal Democrat	383
		PREEN, Michael Alan	Labour	267
		HATCHMAN, William Walter	British National Party	242
Louth Rural North	→	JOHNSON, Jean	Conservative	1483	2336	883	35.2%	6637
		PRATLEY, Stephen	Liberal Democrat	600
		JEFFREY, Graham Aubrey	Labour	253
Louth South	→	HOUGH, John Duncombe	Labour	970	2698	220	36.5%	7396
		SMITH, Derek Raymond	Conservative	750
		HORTON, George Edward	Lincolnshire Independents	345
		BOUCHIER, Malcolm Ernest	British National Party	242
		BASKETT, Jeremy Kingsley	Liberal Democrat	222
		TREANOR, Francis William Patrick	No Political Affiliation	169
Louth Wolds	→	MARFLEET, Charles Edward Hugo	Conservative	1408	2954	637	46.8%	6315
		SIMPSON, Daniel Anthony	Lincolnshire Independents	771
		HATTERSLEY, John	British National Party	318
		NEEDHAM, Eric John	Liberal Democrat	304
		PECK, Richard James	Labour	153
Mablethorpe		GOODING, Graham Michael	Conservative	806	2461	48	36%	6828
		BROWN, Terence Bryndley	Lincolnshire Independents	758
	→	HOWARD, Anthony John	Labour	655
		PARKHURST, Graham Dexter	Liberal Democrat	242
Market and West Deeping	→	ROBINSON, Peter Allan	Conservative	1421	2419	947	36.9%	6552
		BAXTER, Ashley John	Green Party	474
		BUTTERFIELD, Thomas	Independent	286
		LEE, Ray	Liberal Democrat	238
Market Rasen Wolds		KEIMACH, Burton Walter	Conservative	1085	2135	35	35.5%	6022
	→	BRIDGER, Kenneth Michael	Liberal Democrat	1050
Nettleham and Saxilby	→	SELLARS, Ray	Liberal Democrat	2012	3325	883	41.9%	7942
		PILGRIM, Roger	Conservative	1129
		STREET, Victoria Louise	Labour	184
North Wolds	→	TURNER, Tony	Conservative	1763	2557	969	38.3%	6674
		SMITH, Robert	Liberal Democrat	794
Ruskington and Cranwell		BAUER, Eran Nicodemus	Conservative	1485	3044	639	37.1%	8209
		WOODHEAD, Alan	Lincolnshire Independents	846
		CLAYTON, Michael Paul	British National Party	434
		BARTLETT, Mark Franklyn	Labour	279
Scotter Rural	→	UNDERWOOD-FROST, Chris	Conservative	1447	2442	656	40.4%	6050
		ROLLINGS, Lesley Anne	Liberal Democrat	791
		RAEBURN, Mark William	Labour	204
Skegness North		SMITH, Mark	Conservative	851	2445	148	33%	7401
	→	ANDERSON, Mark Crawford	Labour	703
		PAIN, John	UK Independence Party	556
		COOKE, George Raymond	Liberal Democrat	189
		WATKINSON, Alan	No Political Affiliation	146
Skegness South		MILNER, Kenneth	Conservative	772	2086	349	31%	6734
		PAIN, Christopher	UK Independence Party	423
	→	KEMP, Phillip Paul	Labour	365
		BINCH, Susan	Liberal Democrat	354
		HARDAKER, James Allen	Green Party	172
Skellingthorpe and Hykeham South		SHORE, Reg	Liberal Democrat	1596	2598	594	33.9%	7663
	→	KIRBY, Geoffrey	Conservative	1002
Sleaford	→	DICKINSON, David Robert	Conservative	790	2391	16	30.5%	7829
		SUITER, David	Lincolnshire Independents	774
		TURNER, Samantha Tracy	Liberal Democrat	306
		TALTON, Steven	Labour	273
		RUSSELL, John Rawlinson	British National Party	248
Sleaford Rural South	→	YOUNG, Barry	Conservative	1794	3428	728	40.4%	8487
		PETO, Liz	Lincolnshire Independents	1066
		HARRIS, Kieran Peter	Liberal Democrat	362
		GRIFFIN, Maureen	Labour	206
Sleaford West and Leasingham	→	SINGLETON, Barry George	Conservative	1088	2398	250	35.6%	6730
		JAMES, Karen Louise	Independent	838
		PHILLIPS, Jean Constance	Liberal Democrat	266
		PATEMAN, Annette Delores	Labour	206
Spalding East and Moulton	→	POLL, Eddy	Conservative	1586	2797	948	31.2%	8960
		RAMKARAN, Anne Elizabeth	Liberal Democrat	638
		WEST, Robert Malcolm Brian	British National Party	573
Spalding Elloe	→	WILLIAMS, Steve	Conservative	1440	2554	326	32.4%	7890
		LARRINGTON, Jo	Independent	1114
Spalding South		DARK, Graham Keith	Independent	981	2406	136	31.1%	7741
		GAMBBA-JONES, Roger	Conservative	845
		WEST, Robert	Independent 2	375
		ROSS, Sheena Leigh	Labour	205
Spalding West	→	JOHNSON, Howard Robert	Conservative	1138	2505	316	31.8%	7886
		SCARLETT, Phil	Independent	822
		MCGRATH, Catherine Maureen	British National Party	341
		HOPKINS, Dermot Michael	Labour	204
Spilsby Fen		SWANSON, James Macaulay	Lincolnshire Independents	1237	2922	16	38%	7699
	→	PEARS, Julia	Conservative	1221
		TEBBUTT, Carl Ian	Liberal Democrat	298
		KOUMI, Lesley Marian Alison Ward	Labour	166
Stamford North		HICKS, John Russell	Independent	786	2283	52	33%	6928
	→	SUMNER, Brian Charles	Conservative	734
		JALILI, Maureen Ann	Liberal Democrat	439
		TURNER, Bill	Labour	324
Stamford Rural	→	TROLLOPE-BELLEW, Thomas Martin	Conservative	1413	3122	494	42%	7429
		DAWSON, John	Independent	919
		PECKETT, Valerie Jane	Liberal Democrat	587
		GOODYER, Eric Neal	Labour	203
Stamford West		BRAILSFORD, David	Conservative	808	1926	278	40.7%	4738
		WALDEN, Clem	Independent	530
		BISNAUTHSING, Harrish Doarkanathsing	Liberal Democrat	502
		TURNER, Trevor John	Labour	86
Sutton Elloe	→	BREWIS, Christopher James Thomas Harrison	Lincolnshire Independents	2161	3147	1282	41.5%	7577
		ROE, Jenny	Conservative	879
		BARKER, Amy Elizabeth	Independent	107
Tattershall Castle	→	HARVEY, Betty	Conservative	1459	3177	809	39.3%	8074
		JEFFERY, Edward	Independent	650
		JOHNSON, Richard Ellis	Liberal Democrat	569
		WILLIAMS, Anthony John	British National Party	355
		STURMAN, Philip Ernest	Labour	144
Wainfleet and Burgh	→	COOPER, Neil Douglas	Conservative	1296	2605	522	37.6%	6935
		PAIN, Valerie	UK Independence Party	774
		RANN, Gemma Alice	Labour	282
		CHARLTON, Lesley Anne	Liberal Democrat	253
Welton Rural		RAWLINS, Sue	Conservative	1937	3526	348	41.9%	8413
	→	HISCOX, Roger Everard	Liberal Democrat	1589
Woodhall Spa and Wragby	→	HOYES, Denis Colin	Conservative	1565	3395	595	47.8%	7108
		LEYLAND, Craig James	Lincolnshire Independents	970
		STEPHENS, Roger William	Liberal Democrat	351
		FRENCH, Patricia	British National Party	350
		WARD, Neil Andrew	Labour	159
