= 2023 North Kesteven District Council election =

2023 English local election

- 4 May 2023

All 43 seats on North Kesteven District Council 22 seats needed for a majority

	First party	Second party
Leader	Richard Wright	Marianne Overton
Party	Conservative	Lincolnshire Independent
Last election	21	16
Seats before	23 (Note: Including three vacant seats previously held by Conservative councillors Terry Boston, Russell Eckert and Amanda Sanderson prior to their respective resignations in late 2022 and early 2023.)	9
Seats after	25	11
	Third party	Fourth party
Leader		Linda Edwards-Shea
Party	Independent	Labour
Last election	6	0
Seats before	11	0
Seats after	5	2
- Results by ward
Leader before election
Richard Wright
Conservative
No overall control
Leader after election
Richard Wright
Conservative

The 2023 North Kesteven District Council election took place on 4 May 2023, to elect all 43 members of North Kesteven District Council in Lincolnshire, England.

The Conservatives won a majority of the seats on the council, which had previously been under no overall control being led by an administration of Conservatives and independent councillors.

== Overview ==
Prior to the election there were two political groups on the council:

- The "Administration Group" led by Conservative councillor Richard Wright, comprising the 20 Conservatives and 7 independent councillors (5 of whom had been elected as Lincolnshire Independents).
- The "North Kesteven Independents" led by Lincolnshire Independent councillor Marianne Overton, comprising the 9 Lincolnshire Independents and 2 independent councillors.
- Two independent councillors were not aligned to any group.

There were also three vacant seats on the council, all of which had previously been held by Conservative councillors who had resigned in late 2022 or early 2023.

New ward boundaries came into effect for this election, but the number of seats on the council remained the same at 43.

At the election the Conservatives won a majority of the seats on the council. Of the five independent councillors elected, four chose to sit together as the "Group of Unaligned Members" led by Chris Goldson, and the other (Jim Clarke) did not belong to any group. Labour won two seats, giving the party its first representation on the council in over twenty years.

== Results summary ==
The overall results were:

2023 North Kesteven District Council election
Party	Seats	Change
Conservative Party	25	▲2
Lincolnshire Independents	11	▲2
Independents	5	▼6
Labour Party	2	▲2

== Ward results ==
The results for each ward were as follows, with an asterisk (*) indicating an incumbent councillor standing for re-election.

=== Ashby de la Launde, Digby and Scopwick ===
Ashby de la Launde, Digby and Scopwick
Party	Candidate	Votes	%	±%
Lincolnshire Independent	Amelia Bailey*	307	50.6	
Conservative	John Money	300	49.4	
Turnout		616	28.44	
Rejected ballots		9	1.5	
Registered electors		2,166		

=== Bassingham Rural ===
Bassingham Rural
Party	Candidate	Votes	%	±%
Conservative	Mary Green*	470	63.5	
Green	Electra Roccio	216	29.2	
Reform	Nicola Smith	54	7.3	
Turnout		743	35.64	
Rejected ballots		3	0.4	
Registered electors		2,085		

=== Billinghay Rural ===
Billinghay Rural
Party	Candidate	Votes	%	±%
Conservative	Sarah Lawrence	unopposed		
Conservative	Gill Ogden*	unopposed		
Turnout				
Registered electors				

=== Bracebridge Heath ===
Bracebridge Heath
Party	Candidate	Votes	%	±%
Conservative	Peter Burley*	649	56.2	
Conservative	Lindsey Cawrey*	644	55.8	
Labour	Clive Allen	471	40.8	
Labour	Funmi Adeyemi	409	35.4	
Turnout		1,154	25.97	
Rejected ballots		12	1.0	
Registered electors		4,490		

=== Branston ===
Branston
Party	Candidate	Votes	%	±%
Lincolnshire Independent	Peter Lundgren*	942	73.6	
Lincolnshire Independent	Paul Turner	655	51.2	
Conservative	Richard Gilding	513	40.1	
Turnout		1,280	28.72	
Rejected ballots		8	0.6	
Registered electors		4,484		

=== Cranwell, Leasingham and Wilsford ===
Cranwell, Leasingham and Wilsford
Party	Candidate	Votes	%	±%
Independent	Jim Clarke*	unopposed		
Conservative	Andrew Hagues	unopposed		
Turnout				
Registered electors				

=== Heckington Rural ===
Heckington Rural
Party	Candidate	Votes	%	±%
Conservative	Sally Tarry*	702	60.2	
Conservative	Stew Ogden*	702	60.2	
Labour	Jennifer Saxby	456	39.1	
Turnout		1,167	29.15	
Rejected ballots		15	1.3	
Registered electors		4,055		

=== Heighington and Washingborough ===
Heighington and Washingborough
Party	Candidate	Votes	%	±%
Conservative	Ian Carrington*	872	42.6	
Conservative	Carola Goodwin*	855	41.7	
Conservative	Reece Harrington	829	40.5	
Lincolnshire Independent	Gareth Bailey	806	39.3	
Lincolnshire Independent	Karen Kirk	794	38.8	
Lincolnshire Independent	Lee Clarke	785	38.3	
Green	Terrance Crawshaw	610	29.8	
Turnout		2,049	34.68	
Rejected ballots		8	0.4	
Registered electors		5,932		

=== Helpringham and Osbournby ===
Helpringham and Osbournby
Party	Candidate	Votes	%	±%
Lincolnshire Independent	Russell Jackson*	616	69.5	
Conservative	Stephen Shanahan-Kluth	220	24.8	
Reform	Angie Jamison	50	5.6	
Turnout		896	37.97	
Rejected ballots		10	1.1	
Registered electors		2,360		

=== Hykeham Central ===
Hykeham Central
Party	Candidate	Votes	%	±%
Conservative	Stephen Roe*	1,116	57.6	
Conservative	Mike Clarke	871	44.9	
Conservative	Jonathan Pessol	801	41.3	
Lincolnshire Independent	Gary Edwards	795	41.0	
Liberal Democrats	Nat Sweet	635	32.7	
Liberal Democrats	George Tipler	600	30.9	
Turnout		1,939	29.7	
Rejected ballots		18	0.9	
Registered electors		6,529		

=== Hykeham Fosse ===
Hykeham Fosse
Party	Candidate	Votes	%	±%
Labour	Matthew Lofts	452	43.1	
Conservative	Ross Little*	387	36.9	
Conservative	Pamela Whittaker*	342	32.6	
Liberal Democrats	Corinne Byron	227	21.7	
Green	David Ventura	227	21.7	
Liberal Democrats	Jill Wilson	140	13.4	
Reform	Mark Nind	71	6.8	
Turnout		1,048	21.17	
Rejected ballots		5	0.5	
Registered electors		4,975		

=== Hykeham Memorial ===
Hykeham Memorial
Party	Candidate	Votes	%	±%
Independent	Nikki Dillon*	252	49.9	
Conservative	Nicola Clarke	161	31.9	
Liberal Democrats	Diana Catton	92	18.2	
Turnout		512	21.34	
Rejected ballots		7	1.4	
Registered electors		2,399		

=== Kirkby la Thorpe and South Kyme ===
Kirkby la Thorpe and South Kyme
Party	Candidate	Votes	%	±%
Independent	Mervyn Head*	497	70.2	
Conservative	Mark Allan	211	29.8	
Turnout		710	36.22	
Rejected ballots		2	0.3	
Registered electors		1,960		

=== Metheringham Rural ===
Metheringham Rural
Party	Candidate	Votes	%	±%
Conservative	Fran Pembery*	670	52.6	
Conservative	Dave Parry	643	50.5	
Lincolnshire Independent	Helen Dodd	635	49.9	
Lincolnshire Independent	Gary Blackman	512	40.2	
Turnout		1,273	29.43	
Rejected ballots		6	0.5	
Registered electors		4,346		

=== Navenby and Brant Broughton ===
Navenby and Brant Broughton
Party	Candidate	Votes	%	±%
Conservative	Lucille Hagues*	unopposed		
Lincolnshire Independent	Marianne Overton*	unopposed		
Turnout				
Registered electors				

=== Ruskington ===
Ruskington
Party	Candidate	Votes	%	±%
Conservative	Matthew Waldeck	820	65.7	
Conservative	Richard Wright*	819	65.6	
Lincolnshire Independent	Ken Fernandes	417	33.4	
Turnout		1,249	27.48	
Rejected ballots		11	0.9	
Registered electors		4,585		

=== Skellingthorpe and Eagle ===
Skellingthorpe and Eagle
Party	Candidate	Votes	%	±%
Independent	Christopher Goldson*	851	63.0	
Independent	Richard Johnston*	584	43.2	
Conservative	Elizabeth Kendrick	355	26.3	
Labour	Anita Pritchard	255	18.9	
Liberal Democrats	Tony Richardson	187	13.8	
Reform	Jamie-Lee McMillan	65	4.8	
Reform	Nick Smith	56	4.1	
Turnout		1,351	31.2	
Rejected ballots		5	0.4	
Registered electors		4,346		

=== Sleaford Castle ===
Sleaford Castle
Party	Candidate	Votes	%	±%
Labour	Linda Edwards-Shea	199	38.1	
Conservative	Malcolm Offer*	194	37.2	
Independent	Dave Darmon	129	24.7	
Turnout		523	23.69	
Rejected ballots		1	0.2	
Registered electors		2,208		

=== Sleaford Holdingham ===
Sleaford Holdingham
Party	Candidate	Votes	%	±%
Lincolnshire Independent	Robert Oates*	280	62.6	
Conservative	Pat Cockcroft	114	25.5	
Independent	Robert Greetham	53	11.9	
Turnout		450	20.41	
Rejected ballots		3	0.7	
Registered electors		2,205		

=== Sleaford Navigation ===
Sleaford Navigation
Party	Candidate	Votes	%	±%
Lincolnshire Independent	David Suiter*	354	64.4	
Conservative	Nadim Aziz	196	35.6	
Turnout		561	24.8	
Rejected ballots		11	2.0	
Registered electors		2,262		

=== Sleaford Quarrington and Mareham ===
Sleaford Quarrington and Mareham
Party	Candidate	Votes	%	±%
Lincolnshire Independent	Bob Oldershaw*	660	40.3	
Conservative	Mark Smith	612	37.3	
Conservative	Bozena Allan*	574	35.0	
Conservative	Melody Shanahan-Kluth*	572	34.9	
Lincolnshire Independent	Adrian Snookes	524	32.0	
Independent	Steve Mason	475	29.0	
Labour	Jo Thompson	395	24.1	
Labour	Ian Dutton	390	23.8	
Turnout		1,639	27.13	
Rejected ballots		18	1.1	
Registered electors		6,108		

=== Sleaford Westholme ===
Sleaford Westholme
Party	Candidate	Votes	%	±%
Lincolnshire Independent	Ann Mear	151	29.5	
Independent	Anthony Brand*	150	29.3	
Labour	Eileen Randall	119	23.2	
Independent	Heather Lorimer	92	18.0	
Turnout		512	25.23	
Rejected ballots		16	3.1	
Registered electors		2,093		

=== Waddington Rural ===
Waddington Rural
Party	Candidate	Votes	%	±%
Conservative	Matthew Cooper	756	46.2	
Conservative	Lance Pennell*	734	44.8	
Conservative	Leigh Sanders	704	43.0	
Lincolnshire Independent	James Earnshaw	695	42.4	
Labour	John Mitchell	655	40.0	
Labour	Nirmal Chapman	593	36.2	
Turnout		1,638	26.86	
Rejected ballots		8	0.5	
Registered electors		6,128		

=== Witham St Hughs and Swinderby ===
Witham St Hughs and Swinderby
Party	Candidate	Votes	%	±%
Lincolnshire Independent	Peter Overton*	616	68.4	
Lincolnshire Independent	Mitch Elliott	542	60.2	
Conservative	Sue Howe	284	31.5	
Conservative	Stuart Robinson	256	28.4	
Turnout		901	24.58	
Rejected ballots		10	1.1	
Registered electors		3,706		

== Changes 2023–2027 ==
- Robert Oates (Sleaford Holdingham), elected as a Lincolnshire Independents councillor, has since joined the Conservative Party.
- Amelia Bailey (Ashby de la Launde, Digby and Scopwick), elected as a Lincolnshire Independents councillor, now sits as a Reform UK councillor.

=== By-elections ===
==== Billinghay Rural ====
Billinghay Rural by-election 14 December 2023
Party	Candidate	Votes	%	±%
Liberal Democrats	Adrian Michael Whittle	354	41.1	N/A
Conservative	Joseph Andrew Wilkes (Andy Wilkes)	254	29.5	+29.5
Lincolnshire Independent	Wendy Anne Liles	225	26.1	N/A
Independent	Anthony Righini-Brand (Anthony Brand)	29	3.4	N/A
Turnout		863	19.86	N/A
Rejected ballots		1	0.1	
Registered electors		4,345		
Liberal Democrats gain from Conservative				

By-election triggered by death of Conservative councillor Gill Ogden.

==== Heckington Rural ====
A by-election was held after Conservative councillor Stewart Ogden resigned.

Heckington Rural by-election: 21 March 2024
Party	Candidate	Votes	%	±%
Conservative	Christine Collard	425	33.7	
Lincolnshire Independent	Dave Darmon	369	29.2	
Liberal Democrats	Susan Hislop	345	27.3	
Labour	Jennie Peacock	123	9.7	
Majority		56	4.4	
Turnout		1,266	31.06	
Rejected ballots		5	0.4	
Registered electors		4,076		
Conservative hold				

==== Bracebridge Heath ====
A by-election was held after the death of Conservative councillor Peter Burley.

Bracebridge Heath by-election: 20 March 2025
Party	Candidate	Votes	%	±%
Conservative	David Nash	308	33.3	–24.6
Reform	Mark Nind	286	30.9	N/A
Independent	Chris Barr	153	16.5	N/A
Labour	Funmi Adeyemi	99	10.7	–31.4
Green	Christopher Rattigan-Smith	43	4.6	N/A
Liberal Democrats	Stephen Chapman	36	3.9	N/A
Majority		22	2.4	N/A
Turnout		926	20.5	–4.5
Rejected ballots		1	0.1	
Registered electors		4,508		
Conservative hold				

==== Sleaford Westholme ====
A by-election was held after the death of Lincolnshire Independents councillor Ann Mear.

Sleaford Westholme by-election: 12 March 2026
Party	Candidate	Votes	%	±%
Reform	Sandy Buchanan	243	45.1	N/A
Lincolnshire Independent	Dave Darmon	87	16.1	▼13.4
Conservative	Mark Webster	81	15	▼24.6
Green	Christopher Rattigan-Smith	55	10.2	N/A
Independent	Anthony Brand	49	9.1	▼20.2
Liberal Democrats	Susan Elizabeth Hislop	12	2.2	N/A
Independent	Alex Tugwell	12	2.2	N/A
Majority		156	20.5	▲20.3
Turnout		539	26.1	▲0.9
Registered electors		2,068		
Reform gain from Lincolnshire Independent				
