= 2017 Lincolnshire County Council election =

2017 UK local government election

← 2013	4 May 2017	2021 →

All 70 seats to Lincolnshire County Council 36 seats needed for a majority
	First party	Second party	Third party
Leader	Martin Hill	Rob Parker
Party	Conservative	Labour	Independent
Last election	35	10	2
Seats won	58	6	4
Seat change	▲23	▼4	▲2
	Fourth party	Fifth party	Sixth party
Party	Lincolnshire Independent	Liberal Democrats	UKIP
Last election	9	3	13
Seats won	1	1	0
Seat change	▼8	▼2	▼13
- Map showing the results of the 2017 Lincolnshire County Council elections.
Council control before election
No Overall Control
Council control after election
Conservative

The 2017 Lincolnshire County Council election took place in non-metropolitan Lincolnshire on 4 May 2017 as part of the 2017 local elections in the United Kingdom. A total of 70 councillors were elected across the seven non-metropolitan districts that make up the administrative county of Lincolnshire from 70 single member electoral divisions by first-past-the-post voting for a four-year term of office. The election did not include North Lincolnshire and North East Lincolnshire as they are separate unitary authorities.

All locally registered electors (British, Irish, Commonwealth and European Union citizens) who were aged 18 or over on Thursday 4 May 2017 were entitled to vote in the local elections. Those who were temporarily away from their ordinary address (for example, away working, on holiday, in student accommodation or in hospital) were also entitled to vote in the local elections, although those who had moved abroad and registered as overseas electors cannot vote in the local elections. It is possible to register to vote at more than one address (such as a university student who had a term-time address and lives at home during holidays) at the discretion of the local Electoral Register Office, but it remains an offence to vote more than once in the same local government election.

The result saw Conservatives led by Leader of the Council Martin Hill achieve a landslide of seats, retaking control of the council, winning 58 out of the 70 seats giving them a majority of 46 over all other parties and leaving 12 councillors in opposition. The result saw the main former opposition of UKIP councillors wiped out, Labour lost four seats and the Lincolnshire Independents were reduced to just a single seat.

== Boundary Changes ==
The Local Government Boundary Commission for England undertook a review of the county in 2016 and recommended a change to the boundaries of the electoral divisions, as well as reducing the number of county councillors by 7 to 70. These changes took effect at the May 2017 election.

== Overall Results ==
Lincolnshire County Council election, 2017 (70 seats)
Party	Candidates						Votes		
Party	Stood	Elected	Gained	Unseated	Net	% of total	%	No.	Net %
Conservative	70	58	23	0	▲23	82.86	53.5	94,357	
Labour	68	6	3	7	▼4	8.57	18.9	33,317	
UKIP	44	0	0	13	▼13	0.00	7.5	13,178	
Liberal Democrats	37	1	0	2	▼2	1.43	5.4	9,471	
Green	24	0	0	0	0	0.00	1.5	2,636	
Independent	20	4	4	2	▲2	5.71	6.7	12,276	
Lincolnshire Independent	19	1	1	9	▼8	1.43	6.3	11,137	
BNP	1	0	0	0	0	0.00	0.03	46	

== Results by electoral division ==
=== Borough of Boston ===
(6 seats, 6 electoral divisions)

Borough of Boston District (6 seats)
Party	Candidates						Votes		
Party	Stood	Elected	Gained	Unseated	Net	% of total	%	No.	Net %
Conservative	6								
Labour	6								
UKIP	6								
Green	5								
Liberal Democrats	3								
Independent	3								
Lincolnshire Independent	2								

==== Boston Coastal ====
Boston Coastal (1 seat)
Party	Candidate	Votes	%	±%
Conservative	Paul Anthony Skinner	1277	44.8	+4.4
UKIP	Felicity Elizabeth Ellen Ransome	493	17.3	−28.5
Independent	Peter Bedford	318	11.2	n/a
Independent	Barrie James Pierpoint	287	10.1	n/a
Labour	Susan Joan Walsh	252	8.8	−5.0
Independent	Ossy Snell	224	7.9	n/a
Turnout		7871	36	+5
Conservative gain from UKIP		Swing		

==== Boston North ====
Boston North (1 seat)
Party	Candidate	Votes	%	±%
Conservative	Aaron Spencer	687	36.0	
UKIP	Carleen Dickinson	458	24.0	
Labour	Nigel Richard Welton	356	18.7	
Liberal Democrats	Jason Stevenson	148	7.8	
Lincolnshire Independent	Tiggs Keywood Wainwright	135	7.1	
Green	Margaret Ann Taylor	122	6.4	
Turnout		1906	25	
Conservative win (new seat)				

==== Boston Rural ====
Boston Rural (1 seat)
Party	Candidate	Votes	%	±%
Conservative	Michael Brookes	1865	68.7	+23.1
UKIP	Jodie Louise Sutton	416	15.3	−25.9
Labour	Norman Allan Walsh	297	10.9	−2.3
Green	Gordon Laurence Stephens	135	5.0	n/a
Turnout		2713	33	+6
Conservative hold		Swing		

==== Boston South ====
Boston South (1 seat)
Party	Candidate	Votes	%	±%
Independent	Alison Mary Austin	981	42.5	n/a
Conservative	David Andrew Brown	717	31.1	+16.2
UKIP	Don Ransome	362	15.7	−27.1
Labour	Andy Cook	174	7.5	+3.1
Green	Victoria Percival	42	1.8	n/a
Liberal Democrats	Mat Mohns	33	1.4	n/a
Turnout		2309	30	−3
Independent gain from Lincolnshire Independent		Swing		

==== Boston West ====
Boston West (1 seat)
Party	Candidate	Votes	%	±%
Conservative	Paula Cooper	708	36.7	+27.6
Labour	Ben Cook	446	23.1	+5.9
UKIP	James Gary Edwards	380	19.7	−25.1
Liberal Democrats	Ralph Douglas Pryke	328	17.0	n/a
Green	Angela Mary Pitt	67	3.5	n/a
Turnout		1929	29	−1
Conservative gain from UKIP		Swing		

==== Skirbeck ====
Skirbeck (1 seat)
Party	Candidate	Votes	%	±%
Conservative	Martin Alexander Griggs	868	40.5	
Labour	Paul Robert Kenny	573	26.7	
UKIP	Sue Ransome	537	25.0	
Lincolnshire Independent	Val Pain	88	4.1	
Green	Sean Matthew Rickell	79	3.7	
Turnout		2145	28	
Conservative win (new seat)				

=== East Lindsey ===
(13 seats, 13 electoral divisions)

East Lindsey District (13 seats)
Party	Candidates						Votes		
Party	Stood	Elected	Gained	Unseated	Net	% of total	%	No.	Net %
Conservative	13								
Labour	13								
UKIP	9								
Lincolnshire Independent	5								
Independent	2								
BNP	1								

==== Alford & Sutton ====
Alford & Sutton (1 seat)
Party	Candidate	Votes	%	±%
Conservative	Colin Matthews	1187	41.1	+8.4
Lincolnshire Independent	Steve Palmer	1145	39.6	+4.5
Labour	Graham Archer	298	10.3	−1.8
UKIP	Julia Pears	258	8.9	−11.1
Turnout		2888	36	+2
Conservative gain from Lincolnshire Independent		Swing		

==== Horncastle & the Keals ====
Horncastle & the Keals (1 seat)
Party	Candidate	Votes	%	±%
Conservative	Bill Aron	1733	63.4	
Labour	Mark William Taylor	541	19.8	
UKIP	Mike Beecham	459	16.8	
Turnout		2733	31	
Conservative win (new seat)				

==== Ingoldmells Rural ====
Ingoldmells Rural (1 seat)
Party	Candidate	Votes	%	±%
Conservative	Colin John Davie	1703	63.3	+10.9
UKIP	Mark Vincent Dannatt	539	20.0	n/a
Labour	Tony Howard	450	16.7	−13.2
Turnout		2692	34	−1
Conservative hold		Swing		

==== Louth North ====
Louth North (1 seat)
Party	Candidate	Votes	%	±%
Conservative	Tony Bridges	1539	56.6	+27.4
Labour	Ros Jackson	1178	43.4	−3.5
Turnout		2717	35	+1
Conservative gain from Labour		Swing		

==== Louth South ====
Louth South (1 seat)
Party	Candidate	Votes	%	±%
Labour	Sarah Rosemary Dodds	1216	40.8	+0.2
Independent	Jill Makinson-Sanders	833	27.9	+1.5
Conservative	Chris Green	788	26.4	+10.6
UKIP	Tristan Rudolf Matthews	101	3.4	−13.8
BNP	Robert John Ashton	46	1.5	n/a
Turnout		2984	38	+4
Labour hold		Swing		

==== Louth Wolds ====
Louth Wolds (1 seat)
Party	Candidate	Votes	%	±%
Conservative	Hugo Marfleet	1873	60.9	+7.4
Lincolnshire Independent	Daniel Anthony Simpson	724	23.5	−2.8
Labour	Kate Elizabeth Anne Berridge	479	15.6	+3.3
Turnout		3076	34	−2
Conservative hold		Swing		

==== Mablethorpe ====
Mablethorpe (1 seat)
Party	Candidate	Votes	%	±%
Labour	Graham Edward Cullen	1024	35.4	+3.2
Conservative	Noi Sear	972	33.6	+26.8
UKIP	John Peter Critchlow	565	19.6	−14.0
Lincolnshire Independent	Pauline June Palmer	328	11.4	−6.0
Turnout		2889	37	−1
Labour gain from UKIP		Swing		

==== Saltfleet & the Cotes ====
Saltfleet & the Cotes (1 seat)
Party	Candidate	Votes	%	±%
Conservative	Daniel McNally	1909	80.0	
Labour	Stephen Anthony Holland	477	20.0	
Turnout		2386	31	
Conservative win (new seat)				

==== Skegness North ====
Skegness North (1 seat)
Party	Candidate	Votes	%	±%
Conservative	Carl Stuart Macey	1116	47.4	+19.8
UKIP	Danny Brookes	666	28.3	−13.1
Labour	Phil Gaskell	572	24.3	−6.7
Turnout		2354	26	−3
Conservative gain from UKIP		Swing		

==== Skegness South ====
Skegness South (1 seat)
Party	Candidate	Votes	%	±%
Conservative	Steve Kirk	1162	46.4	+13.6
Lincolnshire Independent	Chris Pain	515	20.6	n/a
Labour	Maggie Gray	450	18.0	−8.8
UKIP	Susan Anita Jane Blackburn	375	15.0	−20.6
Turnout		2502	29	+1
Conservative gain from UKIP		Swing		

==== Tattershall Castle ====
Tattershall Castle (1 seat)
Party	Candidate	Votes	%	±%
Conservative	Tom Ashton	1922	68.8	+25.0
UKIP	Jonathan Howard Noble	534	19.1	−25.3
Labour	Phillip Martin Smith	338	12.1	+0.2
Turnout		2794	31	−1
Conservative gain from UKIP		Swing		

==== Wainfleet ====
Wainfleet (1 seat)
Party	Candidate	Votes	%	±%
Conservative	Wendy Bowkett	1389	44.9	+10.6
UKIP	Victoria Ayling	661	21.4	−31.5
Lincolnshire Independent	Jim Swanson	618	20.0	n/a
Labour	Ellen Wright	343	11.1	−1.7
Independent	Eddie Hodgson	82	2.7	n/a
Turnout		3093	33	−2
Conservative gain from UKIP		Swing		

==== Woodhall Spa & Wragby ====
Woodhall Spa & Wragby (1 seat)
Party	Candidate	Votes	%	±%
Conservative	Patricia Anne Bradwell	2605	82.3	+32.1
Labour	Colin David Rickett	560	17.7	+6.8
Turnout		3165	36	+2
Conservative hold		Swing		

=== City of Lincoln ===
(8 seats, 8 electoral divisions)

City of Lincoln District (8 seats)
Party	Candidates						Votes		
Party	Stood	Elected	Gained	Unseated	Net	% of total	%	No.	Net %
Conservative	8								
Labour	8								
UKIP	8								
Green	8								
Liberal Democrats	8								

==== Birchwood ====
Birchwood (1 seat)
Party	Candidate	Votes	%	±%
Conservative	Eddie Strengiel	1237	50.0	+20.2
Labour	Rosanne Christina Kirk	870	35.2	+0.1
UKIP	Kevin John Harrington	232	9.4	−20.2
Liberal Democrats	Tony Richardson	90	3.6	+1.9
Green	John Anthony Radford	45	1.8	n/a
Turnout		2474	35	+9
Conservative gain from Labour		Swing		

==== Boultham ====
Boultham (1 seat)
Party	Candidate	Votes	%	±%
Labour	Kevin John Clarke	950	49.3	−0.9
Conservative	Alan William Briggs	665	34.5	+15.8
UKIP	Tim Richens	122	6.3	−19.1
Green	Sally Anne Horscroft	112	5.8	n/a
Liberal Democrats	Morgan Fae Aran	78	4.0	−0.7
Turnout		1927	27	+1
Labour hold		Swing		

==== Carholme ====
Carholme (1 seat)
Party	Candidate	Votes	%	±%
Labour	Rob Parker	1593	61.7	
Conservative	Kateryna Roures Salvador	581	22.5	
Green	Benjamin Jeffrey Leigh Loryman	158	6.1	
Liberal Democrats	Stephen Peter Lonsdale	153	5.9	
UKIP	Tony Todd	97	3.8	
Turnout		1927	27	
Labour win (new seat)				

==== Ermine & Cathedral ====
Ermine & Cathedral (1 seat)
Party	Candidate	Votes	%	±%
Conservative	Christopher Edward Reid	1173	41.8	
Labour	Jackie Lisa Kirk	1157	41.2	
UKIP	Andrew Dunn	194	6.9	
Liberal Democrats	Nicole Danielle Pouncey	174	6.2	
Green	Edward Evelyn Francis	109	3.9	
Turnout		2807	40	
Conservative win (new seat)				

==== Hartsholme ====
Hartsholme (1 seat)
Party	Candidate	Votes	%	±%
Conservative	Matthew Fido	1022	41.9	+9.9
Labour	Geoff Ellis	1000	41.0	+9.2
UKIP	Nicola Jane Smith	233	9.5	−22.6
Liberal Democrats	Lynn Joan Pepper	114	4.7	+0.5
Green	Christopher Padley	71	2.9	n/a
Turnout		2440	34	+5
Conservative gain from UKIP		Swing		

==== Park ====
Park (1 seat)
Party	Candidate	Votes	%	±%
Labour	Julie Elizabeth Killey	1087	53.6	+2.4
Conservative	Alex Sayer	507	25.0	+10.1
UKIP	Hannah Poppy Smith	164	8.1	−15.0
Liberal Democrats	Natasha Seeta Chapman	138	6.8	−1.9
Green	Simon John Offord Tooke	133	6.6	n/a
Turnout		2029	28	+9
Labour hold		Swing		

==== St Giles ====
St Giles (1 seat)
Party	Candidate	Votes	%	±%
Labour	Robin Anthony Renshaw	997	44.6	
Conservative	Andy Kerry	884	39.5	
UKIP	Laura Anastasia Smith	121	5.4	
Liberal Democrats	Caroline Hilda Kenyon	119	5.3	
Green	Fiona McKenna	116	5.2	
Turnout		2237	31	
Labour win (new seat)				

==== Swallow Beck & Witham ====
Swallow Beck & Witham (1 seat)
Party	Candidate	Votes	%	±%
Conservative	Hilton Spratt	1612	55.1	
Labour	Chris Burke	912	31.2	
UKIP	Barry Charles Stonham	177	6.1	
Liberal Democrats	Corinne Byron	126	4.3	
Green	Lee Thomas	96	3.3	
Turnout		2923	41	
Conservative win (new seat)				

=== North Kesteven ===
(11 seats, 11 electoral divisions)

North Kesteven District (11 seats)
Party	Candidates						Votes		
Party	Stood	Elected	Gained	Unseated	Net	% of total	%	No.	Net %
Conservative	11								
Labour	11								
Lincolnshire Independent	8								
Liberal Democrats	7								
UKIP	4								
Green	2								
Independent	2								

==== Bassingham & Welbourn ====
Bassingham & Welbourn (1 seat)
Party	Candidate	Votes	%	±%
Lincolnshire Independent	Marianne Jane Overton	1952	60.4	
Conservative	Raymond John Phillips	1128	34.9	
UKIP	John Diks	128	4.0	
Turnout		3231	36.0	
Lincolnshire Independent win (new seat)				

==== Eagle & Hykeham West ====
Eagle & Hykeham West (1 seat)
Party	Candidate	Votes	%	±%
Conservative	Mike Thompson	1453	59.3	
Lincolnshire Independent	Nikki Dillon	282	11.5	
Liberal Democrats	Ross David Pepper	282	11.5	
Labour	Michael Blackburn	276	11.3	
UKIP	Nick Smith	153	6.2	
Turnout		2452	31.0	
Conservative win (new seat)				

==== Heckington ====
Heckington (1 seat)
Party	Candidate	Votes	%	±%
Conservative	Barry Young	1912	66.7	
Lincolnshire Independent	Susanna Mariam Matthan	398	13.9	
Labour	Paul Andrew Edward-Shea	322	11.2	
Liberal Democrats	George Henry Hill	229	8.0	
Turnout		2867	32	
Conservative win (new seat)				

==== Hykeham Forum ====
Hykeham Forum (1 seat)
Party	Candidate	Votes	%	±%
Conservative	Stephen Peter Roe	1244	57.2	+28.3
Labour	Mark William Reynolds	526	25.2	+11.9
Liberal Democrats	Jim Charters	303	13.9	−17.7
Green	James Daniel Reeves	94	4.3	n/a
Turnout		2173	29	−4
Conservative gain from Liberal Democrats		Swing		

==== Metheringham Rural ====
Metheringham Rural (1 seat)
Party	Candidate	Votes	%	±%
Conservative	Rob Kendrick	1384	58.9	
Lincolnshire Independent	Nick Byatt	504	21.4	
Labour	John Robert Sharman	335	14.2	
Liberal Democrats	Diana Elizabeth Catton	124	5.3	
Turnout		2351	32	
Conservative win (new seat)				

==== Potterhanworth & Coleby ====
Potterhanworth & Coleby (1 seat)
Party	Candidate	Votes	%	±%
Conservative	Ron Oxby	1427	49.6	
Lincolnshire Independent	Peter Charles Lundgren	922	32.0	
Labour	Sally Ann Lane Benthall	332	11.5	
Liberal Democrats	Jill Whitfield	192	6.7	
Turnout				
Conservative win (new seat)				

==== Ruskington ====
Ruskington (1 seat)
Party	Candidate	Votes	%	±%
Conservative	Mark John Storer	1442	50.2	
Lincolnshire Independent	Steve Clegg	1172	40.8	
Labour	Richard Hughes	255	8.9	
Turnout				
Conservative win (new seat)				

==== Sleaford ====
Sleaford (1 seat)
Party	Candidate	Votes	%	±%
Conservative	Kate Cook	1068	47.9	+25.7
Labour	Jim Clarke	410	18.4	+0.6
Lincolnshire Independent	Mark Guy Allen	341	15.3	−12.6
Independent	Paul Coyne	332	14.9	n/a
Liberal Democrats	Darryl Joshua Smalley	66	3.0	n/a
Independent	Robert Charles Greetham	12	0.5	n/a
Turnout		2231	28	+5
Conservative gain from Lincolnshire Independent		Swing		

==== Sleaford Rural ====
Sleaford Rural (1 seat)
Party	Candidate	Votes	%	±%
Conservative	Andrew Gibson Hagues	1430	63.2	
Lincolnshire Independent	David Suiter	484	21.4	
Labour	Linda Edwards-Shea	340	15.0	
Turnout		2261	30	
Conservative win (new seat)				

==== Waddington & Hykeham East ====
Waddington & Hykeham East (1 seat)
Party	Candidate	Votes	%	±%
Conservative	Christine Talbot	1378	62.1	
Labour	Pat Aston	401	18.1	
UKIP	Joe McAndrew	326	14.7	
Green	Flora Weichmann	111	5.0	
Turnout		2220	29	
Conservative win (new seat)				

==== Washingborough ====
Washingborough (1 seat)
Party	Candidate	Votes	%	±%
Conservative	Lindsey Ann Cawrey	1535	67.9	
Labour	Mike Benthall	316	14.0	
Liberal Democrats	Les Whitfield	268	11.8	
UKIP	Elaine Margaret Hamnett	140	6.2	
Turnout		2262	29	
Conservative win (new seat)				

=== South Holland ===
(9 seats, 9 electoral divisions)

South Holland District (9 seats)
Party	Candidates						Votes		
Party	Stood	Elected	Gained	Unseated	Net	% of total	%	No.	Net %
Conservative	9								
Labour	9								
UKIP	6								
Liberal Democrats	5								
Independent	4								
Green	1								

==== Crowland ====
Crowland (1 seat)
Party	Candidate	Votes	%	±%
Conservative	Nigel Harry Pepper	2194	81.6	
Labour	Darryl Baird Kirk	271	10.1	
Liberal Democrats	Charles James Finister	211	7.8	
Turnout		2690	31	
Conservative win (new seat)				

==== Donington Rural ====
Donnington Rural (1 seat)
Party	Candidate	Votes	%	±%
Conservative	Rodney Grocock	1348	58.0	+19.3
Independent	Jane Lesley King	794	34.1	n/a
Labour	Richard James Mair	175	7.5	+0.1
Turnout		2326	31	+3
Conservative hold		Swing		

==== Holbeach ====
Holbeach (1 seat)
Party	Candidate	Votes	%	±%
Conservative	Nick Worth	1536	63.7	+18.9
UKIP	Paul Cayton Foyster	596	24.7	−17.3
Labour	Helena Mair	274	11.4	+2.2
Turnout		2413	30	+2
Conservative hold		Swing		

==== Holbeach Rural ====
Holbeach Rural (1 seat)
Party	Candidate	Votes	%	±%
Conservative	Peter Ephraim Coupland	1964	68.0	+26.6
UKIP	Robert Antony Gibson	535	18.5	−17.8
Labour	Lucinda Emmeline Preston	256	8.9	+1.8
Liberal Democrats	Philip Edward Hammersley	124	4.3	+2.2
Turnout		2890	34	
Conservative hold		Swing		

==== Spalding East ====
Spalding East (1 seat)
Party	Candidate	Votes	%	±%
Conservative	Eddy Poll	1288	59.9	
UKIP	Richard Geoffrey Fairman	504	23.5	
Labour	Karen Elizabeth Lee	212	9.9	
Liberal Democrats	Kathleen Mary Tanner	145	6.7	
Turnout		2149	28	
Conservative win (new seat)				

==== Spalding Elloe ====
Spalding Elloe (1 seat)
Party	Candidate	Votes	%	±%
Conservative	Elizabeth Jane Sneath	1383	66.2	+22.7
UKIP	Emily Martha Mary Bates	253	12.1	−27.2
Labour	John Andrew Grocock	155	7.4	−0.3
Green	Martin Blake	128	6.1	n/a
Independent	Douglas William Dickens	87	4.2	n/a
Liberal Democrats	Mark John Currier	80	3.8	n/a
Turnout				
Conservative hold		Swing		

==== Spalding South ====
Spalding South (1 seat)
Party	Candidate	Votes	%	±%
Conservative	Christine Jane Lawton	1138	58.2	+32.2
UKIP	Pete Williams	426	21.8	−14.8
Labour	Andrew Charles Bowell	259	13.2	+6.2
Liberal Democrats	Jordan Philip Raymond Swallow	133	6.8	n/a
Turnout		1956	25	+2
Conservative gain from UKIP		Swing		

==== Spalding West ====
Spalding West (1 seat)
Party	Candidate	Votes	%	±%
Independent	Angela Mary Newton	1026	46.0	n/a
Conservative	Gary John Taylor	976	43.7	+22.2
Labour	Wojciech Stanislaw Kowalewski	221	9.9	+3.4
Turnout		2231	29	+2
Independent gain from Lincolnshire Independent		Swing		

==== The Suttons ====
The Suttons (1 seat)
Party	Candidate	Votes	%	±%
Independent	Christopher James Thomas Harrison Brewis	1375	54.0	n/a
Conservative	Jack Tyrrell	1017	40.0	+14.2
Labour	Paul Gowen	153	6.0	+0.6
Turnout		2545	33	+4
Independent gain from Lincolnshire Independent		Swing		

=== South Kesteven ===
(14 seats, 14 electoral divisions)

South Kesteven District (14 seats)
Party	Candidates						Votes		
Party	Stood	Elected	Gained	Unseated	Net	% of total	%	No.	Net %
Conservative	14								
Labour	14								
Liberal Democrats	8								
Green	6								
Independent	6								
UKIP	4								
Lincolnshire Independent	3								

==== Bourne North & Morton ====
Bourne North & Morton (1 seat)
Party	Candidate	Votes	%	±%
Conservative	Sue Woolley	1950	79.9	
Labour	Robbie Britton	460	18.9	
Turnout		2440	34	
Conservative win (new seat)				

==== Bourne South & Thurlby ====
Bourne South & Thurlby (1 seat)
Party	Candidate	Votes	%	±%
Conservative	Robert Philip Henry Reid	1180	47.9	
Lincolnshire Independent	Helen Nunziatina Joan Powell	786	31.9	
Labour	Bob Mumby	287	11.7	
Liberal Democrats	Ian Beresford Smith	203	8.2	
Turnout		2461	28	
Conservative win (new seat)				

==== Colsterworth Rural ====
Colsterworth Rural (1 seat)
Party	Candidate	Votes	%	±%
Conservative	Bob Adams	1660	67.0	+16.4
Labour	Phil Brett	264	10.7	−3.7
UKIP	Patrick Beese	223	9.0	−22.6
Liberal Democrats	John George Ramsbottom	212	8.6	n/a
Green	Ian Grenville Andrews	116	4.7	n/a
Turnout		2476	33	+4
Conservative hold		Swing		

==== Deepings East ====
Deepings East (1 seat)
Party	Candidate	Votes	%	±%
Conservative	Barry Martin Dobson	1059	45.0	
Labour	Phil Dilks	901	38.3	
Liberal Democrats	Adam Edward Brookes	388	16.5	
Turnout		2355	30	
Conservative win (new seat)				

==== Deepings West & Rural ====
Deepings West & Rural (1 seat)
Party	Candidate	Votes	%	±%
Conservative	Rosemary Helen Woolley	1114	45.2	
Independent	Ashley John Baxter	804	32.6	
Independent	Bob Broughton	544	22.1	
Turnout		2466	31	
Conservative win (new seat)				

==== Folkingham Rural ====
Folkingham Rural (1 seat)
Party	Candidate	Votes	%	±%
Conservative	Martin John Hill	2041	64.8	+15.2
Independent	Jan Wayne Hansen	763	24.2	n/a
Labour	Tracey Ann Forman	339	10.8	+0.8
Turnout		3150	40	+3
Conservative hold		Swing		

==== Grantham Barrowby ====
Grantham Barrowby (1 seat)
Party	Candidate	Votes	%	±%
Conservative	Mark Anthony Whittington	1315	57.0	+19.2
Labour	Louise Kathleen Selisny Clack	815	35.3	+5.4
UKIP	Yvonne Jennifer Stevens	179	7.8	n/a
Turnout		2309	28	+6
Conservative hold		Swing		

==== Grantham East ====
Grantham East (1 seat)
Party	Candidate	Votes	%	±%
Conservative	Linda Wootten	1048	52.1	+14.9
Labour	John George Morgan	547	27.2	−0.2
Independent	Paul Martin	293	14.6	n/a
Green	Helen Joan Andrews	62	3.1	n/a
Liberal Democrats	John Richard Glendy Bland	59	2.9	−0.7
Turnout		2011	27	−5
Conservative hold		Swing		

==== Grantham North ====
Grantham North (1 seat)
Party	Candidate	Votes	%	±%
Conservative	Ray Wootten	2119	74.1	+24.9
Labour	Rob Shorrock	412	14.4	+0.8
Liberal Democrats	Claire Jayne Lunn	168	5.9	n/a
Green	Ian Paul Simmons	152	5.3	n/a
Turnout		2859	33	+1
Conservative hold		Swing		

==== Grantham South ====
Grantham South (1 seat)
Party	Candidate	Votes	%	±%
Conservative	Adam Neil Stokes	802	39.8	−4.0
Labour	Charmaine Dawn Morgan	789	39.1	−8.3
UKIP	Joshua Scarborough	173	8.6	n/a
Liberal Democrats	Ellie Symonds	104	5.2	−3.5
Green	Gerhard Lohmann-Bond	97	4.8	n/a
Independent	Louis Jon Stead	47	2.3	n/a
Turnout		2016	25	+4
Conservative gain from Labour		Swing		

==== Grantham West ====
Grantham West (1 seat)
Party	Candidate	Votes	%	±%
Conservative	Richard Graham Davies	988	60.7	
Labour	Sue Orwin	275	16.9	
Independent	Mike Taylor	169	10.4	
Green	Sarah Alexandra Tatlow	116	7.1	
Independent	Stephen Robert Hewerdine	69	4.2	
Turnout		1627	29	
Conservative win (new seat)				

==== Hough ====
Hough (1 seat)
Party	Candidate	Votes	%	±%
Conservative	Alexander Paul Maughan	1722	53.1	+12.3
Independent	Paul Wood	1228	37.8	−11.1
Labour	Stephen James Linden-Wyatt	290	8.9	−1.4
Turnout		3245	40	+3
Conservative gain from Independent		Swing		

==== Stamford East ====
Stamford East (1 seat)
Party	Candidate	Votes	%	±%
Conservative	Robert Lloyd Foulkes	1059	44.7	
Liberal Democrats	Harrish Bisnauthsing	507	21.4	
Labour	Deborah Jane Frances Hughes	289	12.2	
Independent	Steve Carroll	288	12.2	
UKIP	David Thomas Taylor	219	9.3	
Turnout		2367	28	
Conservative win (new seat)				

==== Stamford West ====
Stamford West (1 seat)
Party	Candidate	Votes	%	±%
Conservative	David Brailsford	1573	65.7	+5.7
Liberal Democrats	Anita Annabelle Dora Day	333	13.9	−12.5
Labour	Adam Robert Wissen	265	11.1	−2.5
Green	Simon Whitmore	216	9.0	n/a
Turnout		2396	32	+6
Conservative hold		Swing		

=== West Lindsey ===
(9 seats, 9 electoral divisions)

West Lindsey District (9 seats)
Party	Candidates						Votes		
Party	Stood	Elected	Gained	Unseated	Net	% of total	%	No.	Net %
Conservative	9								
Labour	9								
UKIP	7								
Liberal Democrats	6								
Independent	3								
Green	2								
Lincolnshire Independent	1								

==== Bardney & Cherry Willingham ====
Bardney & Cherry Willingham (1 seat)
Party	Candidate	Votes	%	±%
Conservative	Ian Gordon Fleetwood	1523	53.3	+20.4
Lincolnshire Independent	Chris Darcel	743	26.0	−3.6
Labour	Denise Mary Schofield	317	11.1	+0.4
UKIP	Sharon Anne Spicer	155	5.4	−17.7
Green	Vicky Pearson	121	4.2	n/a
Turnout		2859	34	−1
Conservative hold		Swing		

==== Gainsborough Hill ====
Gainsborough Hill (1 seat)
Party	Candidate	Votes	%	±%
Liberal Democrats	Matt Boles	596	39.6	+9.5
Conservative	Ashley John Parraton-Williams	402	26.7	+10.3
Labour	David John Cormack	376	25.0	+8.0
UKIP	Tracey Frances Lamy-Edwards	130	8.6	−27.9
Turnout		1504	21	+4
Liberal Democrats gain from UKIP		Swing		

==== Gainsborough Rural South ====
Gainsborough Rural South (1 seat)
Party	Candidate	Votes	%	±%
Conservative	Richard David Butroid	1655	54.9	+20.2
Liberal Democrats	Noel Joseph Mullally	638	21.1	−0.4
Labour	Nick Smith	324	10.7	−3.7
UKIP	Samuel George Wardle	262	8.7	−20.6
Green	Susan Kathleen Greenall	138	4.6	n/a
Turnout		3017	36	−3
Conservative hold		Swing		

==== Gainsborough Trent ====
Gainsborough Trent (1 seat)
Party	Candidate	Votes	%	±%
Independent	Paul Michael Key	617	34.0	n/a
Liberal Democrats	Trevor Victor Young	538	29.6	−11.8
Conservative	Sheila Christine Bibb	327	18.0	+2.9
Labour	Ian Richard Bradley	224	12.3	−3.8
UKIP	Neville Shaun Jones	110	6.1	−21.3
Turnout		1816	24	+7
Independent gain from Liberal Democrats		Swing		

==== Market Rasen Wolds ====
Market Rasen Wolds (1 seat)
Party	Candidate	Votes	%	±%
Conservative	Lewis Strange	1655	49.9	+18.2
Liberal Democrats	Stephen Bunney	667	20.1	+0.5
Independent	Guy Edward Donald Grainger	504	15.2	n/a
Labour	Ian Edwards Sharp	286	8.6	−2.4
UKIP	Greg Gough	207	6.2	−23.3
Turnout		3319	36	+9
Conservative hold		Swing		

==== Nettleham & Saxilby ====
Nettleham & Saxilby (1 seat)
Party	Candidate	Votes	%	±%
Conservative	Jackie Brockway	1955	67.9	+24.2
Liberal Democrats	Christopher Higham	559	19.4	−1.6
Labour	Robert John Frederick Methuen	281	9.8	−1.1
UKIP	William Billett	83	2.9	−21.5
Turnout		2878	36	+3
Conservative hold		Swing		

==== North Wolds ====
North Wolds (1 seat)
Party	Candidate	Votes	%	±%
Conservative	Tony Turner	1953	75.3	+20.9
Labour	Andrea Maria Clarke	642	24.7	+10.3
Turnout		2595	30	+2
Conservative hold		Swing		

==== Scotter Rural ====
Scotter Rural (1 seat)
Party	Candidate	Votes	%	±%
Conservative	Clio Lyndon Perraton-Williams	1363	49.7	+7.7
Liberal Democrats	Lesley Ann Rollings	841	30.7	+7.8
Labour	Jonathan Mark Harper	307	11.2	+1.1
UKIP	John Edwin Saxon	232	8.5	−16.5
Turnout		2743	33	+6
Conservative hold		Swing		

==== Welton Rural ====
Welton Rural (1 seat)
Party	Candidate	Votes	%	±%
Conservative	Sue Rawlins	1902	62.4	+23.9
Independent	Diana Meriel Rodgers	599	19.6	n/a
Labour	Brian Paul Jones	548	18.0	+5.6
Turnout		3049	35	+3
Conservative hold		Swing		
