= Lincolnshire County Council elections =

Local government elections in Lincolnshire, England

Lincolnshire County Council in England is elected every four years.

== Council elections ==
- 1973 Lincolnshire County Council election
- 1977 Lincolnshire County Council election
- 1981 Lincolnshire County Council election (boundary changes)
- 1985 Lincolnshire County Council election
- 1989 Lincolnshire County Council election
- 1993 Lincolnshire County Council election
- 1997 Lincolnshire County Council election
- 2001 Lincolnshire County Council election (boundary changes increased the number of seats by 1)
- 2005 Lincolnshire County Council election
- 2009 Lincolnshire County Council election
- 2013 Lincolnshire County Council election
- 2017 Lincolnshire County Council election
- 2021 Lincolnshire County Council election
- 2025 Lincolnshire County Council election

== Council composition ==
Year	Conservative	Labour	Liberal Democrats (Note: Includes totals for the predecessors of the Liberal Democrats, the Liberal Party and SDP (both of which participated in the Alliance).)	Reform	Green	UKIP	DLP	Independents & Others	Council control after election
Local government reorganisation; council established (75 seats)
1973	35	9	3	–	–	–	5	23	No overall control
1977	54	5	2	–	0	–	1	13	Conservative
New division boundaries; seats increased from 75 to 76
1981	42	13	10	–	0	–	–	11	Conservative
1985	39	14	20	–	0	–	–	3	Conservative
1989	39	19	12	–	0	–	–	6	Conservative
1993	31	25	15	–	0	–	–	5	No overall control
1997	43	19	11	–	0	0	–	3	Conservative
New division boundaries; seats increased from 76 to 77
2001	49	21	4	–	0	0	–	3	Conservative
2005	45	21	8	–	0	0	–	3	Conservative
2009	60	4	5	–	0	0	–	8 (Note: Including 4 Lincolnshire Independents, 1 Boston Bypass Independents)	Conservative
2013	36	12	3	–	0	16	–	10 (Note: Including 8 Lincolnshire Independents)	No overall control
New division boundaries; seats reduced from 77 to 70
2017	58	6	1	–	0	0	–	5 (Note: Including 1 Lincolnshire Independent)	Conservative
2021	54	4	3	0	0	0	–	9 (Note: Including 3 South Holland Independents, 1 Lincolnshire Independents)	Conservative
2025	14	3	5	44	0	0	–	4 (Note: Including 1 Lincolnshire Independents)	Reform

== County result maps ==
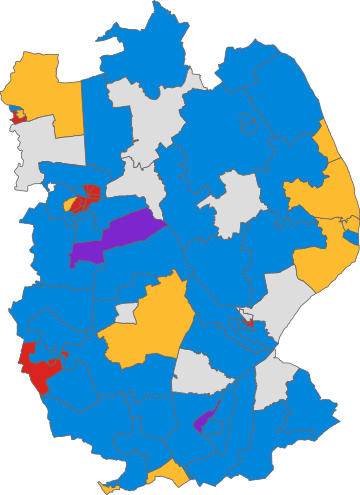
1981 results map

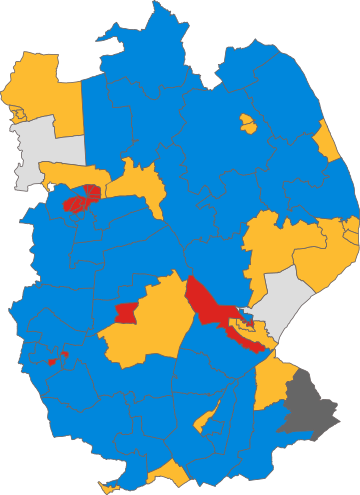
1985 results map

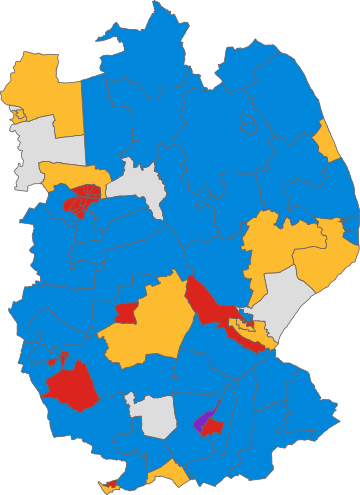
1989 results map

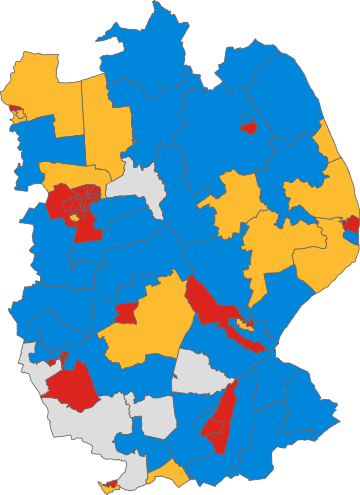
1993 results map

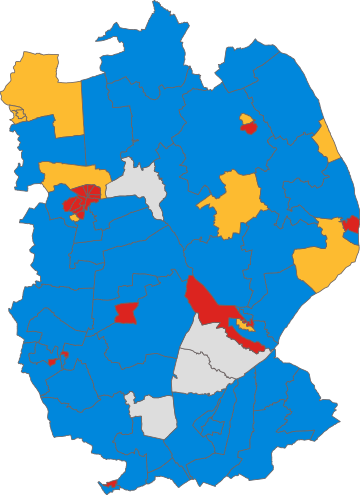
1997 results map

2001 results map

2005 results map

2009 results map

2013 results map

2017 results map

2021 results map

2025 results map

== By-election results ==
=== 1997–2001 ===
Boston Rural South By-Election 23 September 1999
Party	Candidate	Votes	%	±%
Conservative		449	46.8	−19.2
Liberal Democrats		354	36.9	+36.9
Labour		156	16.3	−17.7
Majority		95	9.9	
Turnout		959	13.0	
Conservative hold		Swing		

Gainsborough North By-Election 18 November 1999
Party	Candidate	Votes	%	±%
Liberal Democrats		296	46.9	+11.5
Conservative		212	33.6	+7.0
Labour		105	16.6	−18.5
Independent		18	2.9	+2.9
Majority		84	13.3	
Turnout		631	13.5	
Liberal Democrats hold		Swing		

=== 2001–2005 ===
Lincoln Boultham By-Election 11 July 2002
Party	Candidate	Votes	%	±%
Labour		524	45.9	−17.4
Independent		339	29.7	+17.3
Conservative		235	20.6	+0.0
Green		44	3.9	+3.9
Majority		185	16.2	
Turnout		1,142	20.6	
Labour hold		Swing		

=== 2005–2009 ===
Boston Coastal By-Election 6 April 2006
Party	Candidate	Votes	%	±%
Conservative	Peter Bedford	800	57.9	+10.3
UKIP	Sue Ransome	217	15.7	−8.8
Labour	Paul Kenny	205	14.8	−13.2
Liberal Democrats	Albert Tebbs	160	11.6	+11.6
Majority		583	42.2	
Turnout		1,382	25.0	
Conservative hold		Swing		

Bourne Castle By-Election 6 July 2006
Party	Candidate	Votes	%	±%
Conservative	Charlotte Farquharson	657	44.6	−2.5
Labour	Trevor Holmes	435	29.5	+2.6
Liberal Democrats	Timothy Fitzgerald	255	17.3	−8.7
UKIP	Jamie Corney	127	8.6	+8.6
Majority		222	15.1	
Turnout		1,474	23.5	
Conservative hold		Swing		

Heighington and Washingborough By-Election 15 November 2007
Party	Candidate	Votes	%	±%
Conservative	Clive Oxby	877	61.8	+14.5
Labour	Darren Hopewell	206	14.5	−26.9
Liberal Democrats	Roy Harris	137	9.7	+9.7
BNP	Michael Clayton	126	8.9	+8.9
UKIP	Steven Pearson	52	3.7	−7.6
Independent	Victor Sahunta	21	1.5	+1.5
Majority		671	47.3	
Turnout		1,419	26.2	
Conservative hold		Swing		

Louth Wolds By-Election 31 July 2008
Party	Candidate	Votes	%	±%
Conservative	Hugo Marfleet	1,013	49.9	+13.5
Independent	Daniel Simpson	361	17.8	−0.6
Liberal Democrats	Eric Needham	304	15.0	−18.4
BNP	Robert West	219	10.8	+10.8
Labour	Michael Preen	75	3.7	+3.7
UKIP	Barry Gleeson	59	2.9	−9.0
Majority		652	32.1	
Turnout		2,031	31.9	
Conservative hold		Swing		

Bourne Abbey By-Election 2 October 2008
Party	Candidate	Votes	%	±%
Conservative	Sue Woolley	760	41.4	−12.9
Independent	Helen Powell	355	19.3	+19.3
BNP	David Owens	239	13.0	+13.0
Labour	Roberta Britton	202	11.0	−34.7
Liberal Democrats	Peter Morris	198	10.8	+10.8
Green	Ashley Baxter	42	2.3	+2.3
UKIP	Peter Oldham	41	2.2	+2.2
Majority		405	22.1	
Turnout		1,837	21.0	
Conservative hold		Swing		

=== 2009–2013 ===
Boston North West By-Election 15 October 2009
Party	Candidate	Votes	%	±%
Conservative	Andrea Jenkyns	597	38.7	+13.2
BNP	David Owens	581	37.7	+17.1
Labour	Pam Kenny	204	13.2	+1.9
Liberal Democrats	Michael Shriden-Shinn	160	10.4	+3.2
Majority		16	1.0	
Turnout		1,542	21.3	
Conservative hold		Swing		

Sleaford West and Leasingham By-Election 13 October 2011
Party	Candidate	Votes	%	±%
Conservative	Andrew Hagues	614	43.0	−2.4
Lincolnshire Independent	David Suiter	454	31.8	+31.8
Labour	Jim Clarke	315	22.1	+13.5
Liberal Democrats	David Harding-Price	45	3.2	−7.9
Majority		160	11.2	
Turnout		1,428		
Conservative hold		Swing		

Lincoln East By-Election 2 August 2012
Party	Candidate	Votes	%	±%
Labour	Robin Renshaw	563	48.8	+14.5
Conservative	Simon Parr	314	27.2	−11.8
Liberal Democrats	John Bishop	95	8.2	−18.5
UKIP	Pat Nurse	79	6.8	+6.8
TUSC	Nick Parker	79	6.8	+6.8
English Democrat	Elliot Fountain	24	2.1	+2.1
Majority		249	21.6	
Turnout		1,154		
Labour gain from Conservative		Swing		

Nettleham and Saxilby By-Election 6 September 2012
Party	Candidate	Votes	%	±%
Conservative	Jackie Brockway	1,026	43.4	+9.4
Liberal Democrats	Charles Shaw	600	25.4	−35.1
UKIP	Howard Thompson	266	11.2	+11.2
Labour	Richard Coupland	257	10.9	+5.4
Lincolnshire Independent	David Watson	196	8.3	+8.3
English Democrat	Elliot Fountain	21	0.9	+0.9
Majority		426	18.0	
Turnout		2,366		
Conservative gain from Liberal Democrats		Swing		

=== 2013–2017 ===
Scotter Rural By-Election 19 December 2013
Party	Candidate	Votes	%	±%
Liberal Democrats	Lesley Rollings	726	49.2	+26.3
Conservative	Richard Butroid	348	23.6	−18.4
UKIP	Nick Smith	264	17.9	−7.1
Lincolnshire Independent	Chris Darcel	137	9.3	+9.3
Majority		378	25.6	
Turnout		1,475		
Liberal Democrats gain from Conservative		Swing		

Stamford North By-Election 11 December 2014
Party	Candidate	Votes	%	±%
UKIP	Robert Foulkes	400	31.5	+31.5
Labour	Mark Ashberry	268	21.1	+0.1
Conservative	Matthew Lee	261	20.6	−11.0
Lincolnshire Independent	Max Sawyer	199	15.7	+15.7
Liberal Democrats	Harrish Bisnauthsing	142	11.2	+11.2
Majority		132	10.4	
Turnout		1,270		
UKIP gain from Independent		Swing		

Grantham Barrowby By-Election 2 July 2015
Party	Candidate	Votes	%	±%
Conservative	Mark Whittington	579	49.5	+11.7
Labour	Rob Shorrock	257	22.0	−7.9
UKIP	Maureen Simon	179	15.3	+15.3
Lincolnshire Independent	Mike Williams	155	13.2	+13.2
Majority		322	27.5	
Turnout		1,170		
Conservative hold		Swing		

=== 2021–2025 ===
Colsterworth Rural By-Election 24 February 2022
Party	Candidate	Votes	%	±%
Conservative	Charlotte Vernon	986	59.6	−17.2
Liberal Democrats	Harrish Bisnauthsing	277	16.8	+16.8
Labour	Stuart Fawcett	269	16.3	−6.9
Green	Mike Turner	121	7.3	+7.3
Majority		709	42.9	
Turnout		1,653		
Conservative hold		Swing		

Spalding West By-Election 8 December 2022
Party	Candidate	Votes	%	±%
SH Independents	Manzur Hasan	676	63.2	−17.5
Conservative	Paul Redgate	393	36.8	+17.5
Majority		283	26.4	
Turnout		1,069		
SH Independents hold		Swing		

Eagle and Hykeham West By-Election 4 May 2023
Party	Candidate	Votes	%	±%
Conservative	Alan Briggs	759	32.5	−31.3
Lincolnshire Independent	Charles Overton	470	20.1	+20.1
Labour	Calum Watt	439	18.8	+4.4
Independent	Nikki Dillon	299	12.8	−3.5
Liberal Democrats	Tony Richardson	178	7.6	+2.1
Green	Sally Horscroft	103	4.4	+4.4
Reform	Nicola Smith	75	3.2	+3.2
Liberal	Charles Shaw	10	0.4	+0.4
Majority		289	12.4	
Turnout		2,333		
Conservative hold		Swing		

Carholme By-Election 14 September 2023
Party	Candidate	Votes	%	±%
Labour	Neil Murray	896	48.0	−9.8
Liberal Democrats	James Brown	680	36.4	+32.5
Conservative	Thomas Hulme	150	8.0	−16.4
TUSC	Nick Parker	74	4.0	+2.3
Reform	Jane Smith	66	3.5	+3.5
Majority		216	11.6	
Turnout		1,866		
Labour hold		Swing		

Grantham North By-Election 9 November 2023
Party	Candidate	Votes	%	±%
Conservative	Paul Martin	762	39.2	−31.6
Independent	Tim Harrison	446	23.0	+23.0
Labour	Jonathan Cook	380	19.6	+2.1
Green	Anne Gayfer	193	9.9	−1.8
Liberal Democrats	Nat Sweet	87	4.5	+4.5
Independent	Dean Ward	74	3.8	+3.8
Majority		316	16.3	
Turnout		1,942		
Conservative hold		Swing		

Park By-Election 2 May 2024
Party	Candidate	Votes	%	±%
Labour	Debbie Armiger	1,054	45.2	−1.7
Liberal Democrats	Martin Christopher	656	28.1	+11.2
Reform	Jane Smith	212	9.1	+5.7
Green	Sally Horscroft	192	8.2	−1.1
Conservative	Charlie Rogers	148	6.3	−14.8
TUSC	Emma Knight	48	2.1	−0.3
Liberal	Charles Shaw	22	0.9	+0.9
Majority		398	17.1	
Turnout		2,332		
Labour hold		Swing		
