= Rob Parker (British politician) =

British local politician

Leader of Lincolnshire County Council
- In office 21 May 1993 – 16 May 1997
- Deputy: Maurice French
- Preceded by: Bill Wyrill
- Succeeded by: Jim Speechley

Labour Group Leader on Lincolnshire County Council
- In office May 2017 – 3 August 2023
- Preceded by: John Hough
- Succeeded by: Karen Lee
- In office 1991 – 6 May 2013
- Succeeded by: John Hough

Lincolnshire County Councillor for Carholme
- In office 4 May 1989 – 3 August 2023
- Preceded by: Sidney Campbell
- Succeeded by: Neil Murray

Personal details
- Born: Robert Bernard Parker; 1947 Lincoln, England, UK
- Died: 11 December 2023 (aged 75–76)
- Party: Labour
- Spouse: Sue Parker
- Children: 3
- Education: Open University
- Occupation: Civil servant, Lecturer

Robert Bernard Parker (1947–2023) was a British local politician. He was leader of Lincolnshire County Council between 1993 and 1997, and was leader of the Labour group on the Council twice (1991–2013 and 2017-2023).

== Early life and employment ==
Parker was born in Lincoln and worked as a civil servant for over twenty years, eventually at the Department for Health and Social Services; he completed an undergraduate degree in applied social science with the Open University in the early 1980s and then began working as a social worker for Lincolnshire County Council. He later became a lecturer in politics at the University of Lincoln and the Open University.

== Political career ==
Parker stood for election as the Labour candidate for Carholme ward in the 1989 Lincolnshire County Council election. The ward had been held by Conservatives at each election since the county council was established in 1973; the incumbent candidate, Sidney Campbell, had held the seat since 1981. But Parker won the seat, with 1,392 votes and a 531 vote majority over Campbell. In 1991, Parker became leader of the Labour Party group on the council, which was then in opposition.

=== Council Leader ===
Before the 1993 County Council election, the Conservative group had been in power since the Council's establishment in 1974; they held 41 of the 75 seats, just two more than a majority; Labour held 18 and the Liberal Democrats 12, with a further 3 seats held by independents. Labour contested 50 seats across the county, including Conservative-held wards around Lincoln. Parker told the Local Government Chronicle that his party focused the most intensive campaigning on six seats. According to the Lincolnshire Echo, the Liberal Democrats were hoping to become "power brokers" and stated that they were open to discuss supporting either the Conservatives or Labour. But the Conservative leader Bill Wyrill ruled out sharing power with them, arguing that Labour and the Liberal Democrats would likely over-spend in power. Parker was quoted saying, "We are fighting to win. But if no party gets the 39 seats there will have to be discussions. We would have to talk to other parties. A hung council would not be indecisive. It would get things right." Labour's campaign focused on crime and education, proposing a greater police presence on the streets and a higher number of nursery places. The Conservatives opposed Labour on the basis that they would not be frugal with taxpayers' money and pointed to their own record in public finances. But Parker critiqued that stance, saying that "Cuts are being made by other counties. But those areas have enjoyed much better services than we have in Lincolnshire".

In the event, the 1993 election saw the Conservatives lose their majority and ending up with 31 seats; Labour took 25 and the Liberal Democrats 15. The Sleaford Standard described the result as "Blue 'murder'" and another newspaper called it "the most radical power shift in the authority's history". (Note: In the lead up to the election, opposition leaders said that they expected the Conservative government's proposed VAT on fuel would play a part in deciding the result. Wyrill himself said soon after the result that "Looking at the national scene, it's just the fact that the Government is a little bit unpopular at present. Nationally most of the counties have lost more than we have.") In the aftermath, Parker (who had won his seat with an increased majority of 819 votes) entered into negotiations with the leader of the Liberal Democrat group, Maurice French, to form a joint administration. They formed a pact and Parker was appointed leader of the council, with French appointed the deputy leader. Among their first moves was to create an environment sub-committee. Over the next four years, Parker's administration saw the construction and opening of the University of Lincolnshire and Humberside's campus at Lincoln, completed within two years. Parker listed this among his proudest achievements and French stated at the time that they hoped the new university would lead to "high-tech companies" starting "to come to Lincolnshire and you will begin to get more young people moving in". Parker supported the abolition of Humberside as a local authority, but opposed proposals to abolish Lincolnshire County Council and create unitary authorities of the county's district councils. Parker introduced a system of allowing the public to sit on some of the council's committees, which saw 267 applications to do so. At the next election in 1997, Parker also highlighted greater public spending in social services and education, especially nursery provision. However, the Conservatives criticised his administration for accruing £47m of debt since 1993.

=== In opposition ===
The 1997 election was held on the same day as the general election, which returned a landslide majority for the Labour Party. However, despite increasing support in Lincoln wards at the local election, Labour lost support elsewhere and dropped back to 19 seats, the Liberal Democrats falling to 11 and the Conservatives swelling to 43 – two more than their pre-1993 number and enough to form a majority administration. Parker at least held his own seat, with an increased majority (1,081); he remained leader of the Labour group in opposition and was re-elected to the County Council at subsequent ballots in 2001, 2005, 2009 and 2013. He stepped down as the group's leader in 2013, and was unanimously elected its deputy leader. By that time, the party had 11 members on the council. Parker was re-elected to the Council in 2017; his successor as group leader, John Hough, had not contested that election and Parker was re-elected group leader in his place.

In opposition, Parker criticised the council's Conservative leader Jim Speechley, telling The Guardian that Speechley had launched a "scorched earth" campaign against council employees who had been hired by the Labour-Liberal Democrat administration, including the firing of the council's chief executive Jill Barrow. Parker wrote to the Audit Commission in 1999 to complain about what he called the "systematic abuse of power and process for a number of years". The auditors found that severance payments which were made to Barrow and another employee were unlawful; the Commission also went on to investigate further claims about Speechley's management and published a highly critical report in 2002; this, along with a police investigation into "misconduct in a public office", led to Speechley's resignation as leader (he was eventually jailed following the police investigation). Speechley's reluctance to resign led to calls from Parker for the national Conservative Party to intervene or risk the group becoming "essentially the party of sleaze". In the aftermath, Speechley's ally Ian Croft became the new Leader, but he too came under criticism for his treatment of the chief executive David Bowles, who had been a whistleblower in the Speechley affair. In April 2004, Parker urged Croft to retract a letter stating Croft's lack of confidence in Bowles. The Labour group were barred from a mediation meeting between Bowles and Croft held the next month, after the group publicly stated that they believe it was part of an attempt to force Bowles' departure. After Bowles resigned, Parker called on the council to leave a nine-month "period of reflection" before appointing a successor. Another Audit Commission investigation into the council's management led Croft and his cabinet to resign in March 2005; Parker called for a "rainbow coalition" of all the main parties to form an administration in the six weeks before the 2005 local elections, but in the event Croft's successor Martin Hill opted for a Conservative-only administration.

After returning to the Labour group's leadership in 2017, Parker campaigned for greater action on environmental issues and has called on the Conservative-led council to use its some of its reserves to fund essential public services.

== Awards ==
In 2011, Parker was named "Scrutineer of the Year" by the Local Government Information Unit in their annual awards ceremony at Westminster City Hall.

== Death and legacy ==
Parker died on 11 December 2023.

=== Tributes ===
East Midlands Council paid tribute to his career in public service over a span of 30 years BBC Radio Lincolnshire also produced a radio programme entitled: "The man who brought a University to Lincoln".
