= Jill Barrow =

British company director and public administrator

- Born: Jill Helen Barrow; 26 April 1951 (age 74)

Jill Helen Barrow (born 26 April 1951) is a British company director and former public administrator. She was the chief executive of Lincolnshire County Council from 1995 to 1997, and the first woman to be chief executive of any county council in England.

== Early life ==
Jill Helen Barrow was born in Hertfordshire on 26 April 1951, the daughter of Philip Eric Horwood and Mavis Mary, née Handscombe. She received a Certificate of Education from the University of Durham in 1972, and then completed a Bachelor of Arts (BA) degree at the Open University in 1980, before returning to Durham and completed a Master of Education (MEd) course in 1983.

== Career ==
Barrow was a teacher in secondary schools and further education colleges between 1972 and 1986, when she began working in education management and inspection, finally as Head of Policy and Planning at Cumbria County Council's Department of Education. In January 1991, she took up the post of Deputy Director of Education at Essex County Council, serving until 1993. In 1993, she was appointed Director of Education at Surrey County Council. There, she managed a department of 10,000 staff and a £314m budget (£665.8m in March 2025 prices), at a time when the county council were implementing changes to the Age of Transfer, which threatened the viability of several small village schools.

=== Lincolnshire County Council ===
In 1995, Barrow was appointed Chief Executive of Lincolnshire County Council; she was the first woman to become the chief executive of a county council in England. She was appointed by the Labour–Liberal Democrat coalition that had controlled the county council since 1993. Her appointment coincided with a wider reorganisation of officials instigated by he county council's leader, Rob Parker of the Labour Party, which, in the words of the academics Steve Leach and David Wilson, was to "redesign the organisation to respond to the reordered priorities [of the new coalition] and ... ensure that top staff were in post who were in tune with the new political agenda."Parker considered Barrow to be a "successful" appointment. She held regular meetings with Parker while also maintaining the relationship between the Labour and Liberal Democrat groups.

The Conservatives took control of the county council in the 1997 local election. Barrow left her role in December 1997, in a move which was reported to have "surprised" staff and many councillors. In a statement drafted jointly with the council, she said she was leaving to pursue consultancy work. The move was "controversial", according to the Lincolnshire Echo; the leader of the Liberal Democrat Group raised concerns about the reasons for her sudden departure and the potential cost of severance payments, while one Labour councillor called for an inquiry. According to Parker, who remained the leader of the Labour group on the council, the Conservative leadership, headed by Jim Speechley, began a "scorched earth" policy of removing coalition appointees from the council's executive. At the time of her departure, the cost of Barrow's departure was kept secret but it was later revealed that Barrow was given a severance payment amounting to £160,000. Auditors later found this payment to be unlawful, also commenting on the "absence of justification for payments of such magnitude". Speechley was forced to resign as leader in 2002 and was jailed in 2004 over a separate incident, while his successor as leader, Ian Croft, was later found to have "breached the code of conduct for people in public office" over his relations with Barrow's successor as chief executive, David Bowles, who had been a whistleblower in the Speechley scandal.

=== Later career ===
After Barrow left Lincolnshire CC, she worked as an associate fellow at Warwick University Business School. She was appointed Chief Executive of the South-West of England Regional Development Agency, serving between 1999 and 2001. She was a Board Member for England on the National-Lottery-funded New Opportunities Fund from 1999 to 2004. Barrow was then a director at the consultancy firm GatenbySanderson until 2006, when she took up a directorship at the leadership consultancy company Big Blue Experience.

Government offices
Preceded by Malcolm Pinchin	Director of Education; Surrey County Council; 1993–1995	Succeeded by Dr Paul Gray
Preceded by Dudley Proctor	Chief Executive; Lincolnshire County Council; 1995–1997	Succeeded by David Bowles
