= 1981 Lincolnshire County Council election =

1981 UK local government election

← 1977	7 May 1981	1985 →

All 76 seats to Lincolnshire County Council 39 seats needed for a majority
	First party	Second party	Third party
Party	Conservative	Labour	Liberal
Seats won	42	13	10
	Fourth party	Fifth party
Party	Independent	SDP
Seats won	9	2
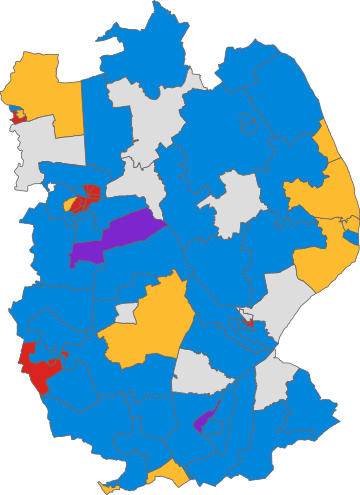
- Map of the results of the election in each division. Colours denote the winning party, as shown in the main table of results.
Council control before election
Conservative
Council control after election
Conservative

The 1981 Lincolnshire County Council election was held on Thursday, 7 May 1981, following boundary changes to the county's electoral divisions. The whole council of 76 members was up for election and the election resulted in the Conservative Party retaining control of the council, winning 42 seats.

== Results by division ==
Each electoral division returned one county councillor. The candidate elected to the council in each electoral division is shown in the table below. "Unopposed" indicates that the councillor was elected unopposed.

Electoral Division	Party	Councillor	Votes
Alford & Spilsby	Conservative	M. Kennedy	967
Alford Coast	Liberal	P. Morley	Unopposed
Bardney & Cherry Willingham	Independent	E. Bramley	883
Bassingham Rural	Conservative	W. Wyrill	1,601
Billinghay & Cranwell	Conservative	Z. Scoley	1,058
Birchwood	Liberal	D. Templeman	1,111
Bolingbroke Castle	Conservative	I. Simons	988
Boston Rural South	Conservative	R. Upsall	858
Boston West	Conservative	C. Fovargue	1,182
Boultham	Labour	L. Wells	1,053
Bourne Abbey	Conservative	D. Fisher	757
Bourne Castle	Conservative	R. Cliffe	1,011
Caenby	Conservative	R. Johnson	1,555
Carholme	Conservative	S. Campbell	952
Cliff	Conservative	W. Rawson	1,046
Coastal	Independent	J. Hildred	1,397
Crowland Rural	Conservative	W. Speechley	1,175
Devon & St Johns	Labour	H. Harris	1,123
Donington Rural	Independent	S. Bingham	824
Earlesfield	Labour	G. Lynch	1,162
East Elloe	Conservative	J. Fisher	Unopposed
Fenside	Conservative	R. Day	882
Folkingham Rural	Conservative	B. Lee	1,045
Gainsborough East	Liberal	R. Rainsforth	1,103
Gainsborough North	Conservative	J. Bassett	771
Gainsborough South	Labour	L. Rainsforth	1,056
Gainsborough Rural North	Liberal	M. French	1,198
Gainsborough Rural South	Independent	J. Westgarth	1,213
Grantham North	Conservative	M. Spencer-Gregson	1,622
Grantham South	Conservative	H. Nadin	1,326
Grantham West	Conservative	H. Brownlow	1,277
Grimsthorpe	Conservative	R. Tamplin	1,019
Harrowby	Labour	E. Davies	1,413
Holbeach	Independent	T. Tyler	Unopposed
Holbeach Fen	Conservative	D. Mawby	Unopposed
Horncastle & Tetford	Independent	F. Cupit	957
Hough	Conservative	P. Newton	Unopposed
Hykeham Forum	Conservative	P. Gaul	1,114
Lincoln Abbey	Labour	J. Robertson	1,283
Lincoln Bracebridge	Conservative	E. Jenkins	1,105
Lincoln Castle	Labour	J. Ward	1,203
Lincoln Moorland	Labour	N. Baldock	891
Lincoln Park	Labour	T. Rook	914
Longdales	Labour	D. Miller	1,088
Louth Marsh	Conservative	J. Libell	1,077
Louth North	Conservative	C. Bennett	830
Louth Rural North	Conservative	R. Brooks	707
Louth South	Conservative	I. Wilkinson	948
Louth Wolds	Conservative	C. Turner	1,032
Mablethorpe	Liberal	W. Baker	1,263
Metheringham	Social Democrat	D. Bates	888
Minster	Labour	J. Metcalfe	1,252
Nettleham & Saxilby	Conservative	P. Heneage	1,476
North East Kesteven	Conservative	F. Marshall	1,325
North Wolds	Conservative	V. Hudson	1,310
Rasen Wolds	Independent	W. Hall	1,054
Skegness North	Liberal	H. Fainlight	1,133
Skegness South	Conservative	L. Parkes	1,149
Skellingthorpe & Hykeham South	Conservative	B. Gledhill	764
Skirbeck	Labour	A. Goodson	1,246
Sleaford	Independent	E. Robertson	1,255
Sleaford Rural North	Conservative	T. Hall	1,425
Sleaford Rural South	Liberal	L. Pinchbeck	1,455
Spalding Abbey	Conservative	D. Guttridge	858
Spalding North & Weston	Conservative	R. King	1,188
Spalding North West	Social Democrat	A. Newton	1,048
Stamford North	Conservative	W. Simpson	924
Stamford South	Liberal	M. Belton	1,456
Tattershall Castle	Conservative	B. Harvey	Unopposed
The Deepings	Liberal	J. Anderson	1,997
Tritton	Labour	F. Wright	1,146
Wainfleet & Burgh	Liberal	J. Dodsworth	1,022
West Elloe	Conservative	G. Walker	Unopposed
Witham	Independent	N. Middlebrook	1,003
Woodhall Spa & Wragby	Conservative	D. Hoyes	Unopposed
Wyberton	Conservative	S. Budge	1,024
