= 1973 Lincolnshire County Council election =

1973 UK local government election

Lincolnshire County Council is a non-metropolitan county in the East Midlands of England. It was formed when the Local Government Act 1972 merged the counties of Holland, Kesteven and Lindsey, and held its first election on 12 April 1973.

The Conservatives were the largest party, gaining 34 of the 74 seats. 22 independent candidates were returned, along with 10 Labour councillors, 5 Democratic-Labour nominees and 3 Liberals. The Democratic Labour seats were all won in Lincoln, where six weeks earlier the MP Dick Taverne had triggered a by-election by breaking away from Labour and forming the DLP; they comprised 5 of the 6 city seats, representing a swing from Labour, who had won all of the seats at the last local elections.

== Results by Division ==
Division	Candidate	Party	Votes
Boston no. 1	Cyril Valentine	Lib	(uncontested)
Boston no. 2	Mrs Haf Towel	Con	955
Boston no. 2	John Addlesee	Lab	946
Boston no. 3	Martin Middlebrook	Ind	(uncontested)
Boston no. 4	Alf Goodson	Lab	(uncontested)
Boston Rural no. 1	Reginald West	Ind	963
Boston Rural no. 1	David Chambers	Ind	655
Boston Rural no. 1	Samuel Woods	Con	407
Boston Rural no. 2	Brian Farrow	Con	932
Boston Rural no. 2	Arthur White	Lab	696
Boston Rural no. 2	Joseph Winter	Ind	689
Boston Rural no. 3	Richard Upsall	Con	1,464
Boston Rural no. 3	Ambrose Newsom	Lab	444
Bourne	Raymond Cliffe	Con	(uncontested)
Caistor Rural no. 1	Harry Key	Ind	(uncontested)
Caistor Rural no. 2	William Hall	Ind	(uncontested)
East Elloe no. 1	Ivor Howes	Ind	786
East Elloe no. 1	Arnold Broughton	Lab	638
East Elloe no. 1	Robert Christian	Con	628
East Elloe no. 1	Fred White	Ind	368
East Elloe no. 2	Ernest Weaver	Lab	477
East Elloe no. 2	Fred Hoyles	Ind	136
East Elloe no. 3	Mrs Alison Hunter	Con	1,573
East Elloe no. 3	Mrs Doris King	Lab	808
East Kesteven no. 1	Eric Fairchild	Con	1,162
East Kesteven no. 1	Sydney King	Lab	1,132
East Kesteven no. 2	Jack Mountain	Ind	865
East Kesteven no. 2	Henry Kelway	Con	576
East Kesteven no. 3	Thomas Hall	Con	1,338
East Kesteven no. 3	Euan Robertson	Ind	762
East Kesteven no. 3	Lionel Dawson	Lab	198
Gainsborough Market	Edgar Salisbury	Lab	725
Gainsborough Market	Mrs Marjorie Renshaw	Con	361
Gainsborough Market	Kenny Hethershaw	Lib	284
Gainsborough North	John Stanley	Lib	915
Gainsborough North	Michael Noble	Lab	673
Gainsborough North	Frank Land	Con	596
Gainsborough South	Leslie Rainsforth	Lab	1,036
Gainsborough South	Miss Charlotte Dordery	Con	594
Gainsborough South	Raymond Greenwood	Lib	449
Gainsborough South	Brian Page	DLP	114
Gainsborough Rural no. 1	Harry Plowright	Ind	(uncontested)
Gainsborough Rural no. 2	Harry Kitchinson	Ind	1,322
Gainsborough Rural no. 2	John Sandars	Con	968
Grantham no. 1	Frank Speechley	Con	987
Grantham no. 1	Fred Chambers	Lab	984
Grantham no. 2	Mrs Elsie Davies	Lab	875
Grantham no. 2	William Harrison	Con	599
Grantham no. 3	Ian Gordon	Con	1,272
Grantham no. 3	Mrs Louise Dickinson	Lab	742
Grantham no. 4	Charles Burrows	Lab	1,491
Grantham no. 4	Kathleen Porter	Con	784
Horncastle	Mrs Lesley Sanderson	Ind	1,034
Horncastle	Mrs Doris Cook	Con	477
Horncastle Rural no. 1	John Smithson	Ind	1,348
Horncastle Rural no. 1	George Daubney	Ind	942
Horncastle Rural no. 1	John Harris	Lib	805
Horncastle Rural no. 2	John Harvey	Con	(uncontested)
Lincoln Abbey	Barry Ashmore	DLP	860
Lincoln Abbey	Bernard Rendall	Con	702
Lincoln Abbey	Cllr Mrs Pam Roussel	Lab	605
Lincoln Boultham	Richard Lucas	Con	630
Lincoln Boultham	Tom Ward	Lab	594
Lincoln Bracebridge	Graham Judge	DLP	1,067
Lincoln Bracebridge	Cllr Bob Hodson	Lab	663
Lincoln Bracebridge	Peter Roe	Con	351
Lincoln Carholme	Ald. John Spence	Con	827
Lincoln Carholme	Cllr John Plant	Lab	778
Lincoln Carholme	Gilbert Blades	Ind	381
Lincoln Castle	Ald. Frank Eccleshare	Ind	924
Lincoln Castle	Cllr Miss Joyce Bennett	Lab	580
Lincoln Castle	Cecil Robinson	Con	466
Lincoln Ermine	Ron Barnes	DLP	1,296
Lincoln Ermine	Cllr Mrs Joyce Naftalin	Lab	1,124
Lincoln Ermine	Cllr David Middleton	Lab	1.059
Lincoln Ermine	F. Horn	Con	729
Lincoln Ermine	A. Cowton	Con	559
Lincoln Hartsholme	Mrs Miriam Richardson	DLP	1,082
Lincoln Hartsholme	Cllr Laurie Valsey	Lab	552
Lincoln Hartsholme	P. Rowley	Con	353
Lincoln Hartsholme	T. Ginniff	Comm	37
Lincoln Minster	Ald. Mrs Mary Sockias	Con	1,170
Lincoln Minster	Mrs Clodaga Wilkinson	DLP	1,090
Lincoln Minster	D. Miller	Lab	559
Lincoln Moorland	Cllr Stan Robertson	Lab	949
Lincoln Moorland	Jim Richards	Con	911
Lincoln Park	Fred Allen*	DLP	831
Lincoln Park	Ald. Bill Herbert	Lab	427
Lincoln Park	Jack Ruddock	Con	392
Louth North	Christopher Bennett	Ind	1,258
Louth North	Francis MacDonald	Ind	505
Louth South	Mrs Irene Wilkinson	Ind	814
Louth South	Mrs Catherine Stubbs	Con	678
Louth Rural no. 1	Rupert Dixon	Ind	827
Louth Rural no. 1	Hewson Silvester	Ind	502
Louth Rural no. 2	Sam Spendlow	Ind	1,327
Louth Rural no. 2	John Codkin	Con	587
Louth Rural no. 3	Donald Webb	Con	782
Louth Rural no. 3	Miss Mary Taylor	Ind	722
Louth Rural no. 3	Durwood Russell	Lab	539
Mablethorpe and Sutton	Peter Poynton	Con	1,203
Mablethorpe and Sutton	Nelly Spink	Ind	871
North Kesteven no. 1	William Wyrill	Con	792
North Kesteven no. 1	Mrs Elsie Mawer	Ind	711
North Kesteven no. 2	Mrs Margery Falla	Con	1,576
North Kesteven no. 2	William Rawson	Lab	1,083
North Kesteven no. 3	Frank Marshall	Ind	1,060
North Kesteven no. 3	William Heele	Con	1,056
North Kesteven no. 3	Maurice Thompson	Lab	498
North Kesteven no. 4	Reg Brealey	Con	1,335
North Kesteven no. 4	Charles Marshall	Ind	1,002
North Kesteven no. 5	Mrs Mary Large	Lab	2,123
North Kesteven no. 5	William Taylor	Con	1,139
North Kesteven no. 6	Herbert Johnson	Con	799
North Kesteven no. 6	Keith Ford	D-Lab	440
North Kesteven no. 6	Mrs Maureen Lynn	Lab	233
Skegness North	Harold Fainlight	Lib	1,262
Skegness North	Joseph Elliott	Con	893
Skegness North	Thomas Senior	Lab	631
Skegness South	Vivian Sheehan-Hunt	Con	1,204
Skegness South	Eric Wright	Lab	540
Sleaford	Miss Grace Nowell	Con	1,670
Sleaford	Peter Haysum	Lab	1,320
South Kesteven no. 1	James Cave	Ind	931
South Kesteven no. 1	Mrs Elizabeth Opperman	Con	799
South Kesteven no. 2	John Hedley Lewis	Con	(uncontested)
South Kesteven no. 3	Mrs Jean Wootton	Con	744
South Kesteven no. 3	Peter Hearn	Ind	705
South Kesteven no. 3	Harold Scarborough	Lab	588
Spalding no. 1	David Guttridge	Con	(uncontested)
Spalding no. 2	Jim King	Con	654
Spalding no. 2	Thomas Addlesee	Lab	560
Spalding no. 3	Cyril Ford	Con	(uncontested)
Spalding Rural no. 1	Jim Speechley	Con	1,177
Spalding Rural no. 1	Alfred Witherington	Lab	1,056
Spalding Rural no. 1	Mrs Lillian Hardy	Ind	789
Spalding Rural no. 2	Harold Chappell	Con	(uncontested)
Spalding Rural no. 3	G. Wray	Con	1,242
Spalding Rural no. 3	T. Kidd	Lab	582
Spilsby no. 1	Charles Leggott	Con	(uncontested)
Spilsby no. 2	Charles Rawlinson	Ind	1,140
Spilsby no. 2	Frank Clow	Con	883
Spilsby no. 3	Harry Simpson	Con	987
Spilsby no. 3	Frank Smith	Lib?	813
Spilsby no. 4	Francis Lapage	Ind	1,221
Spilsby no. 4	Frederick Hepworth	Con	1,066
Stamford no. 1	Ian Allen	Con	1,291
Stamford no. 1	William Turner	Lab	481
Stamford no. 2	Derek Gladman	Lab	869
Stamford no. 2	Anthony Gray	Con	686
Welton no. 1	Edwin Bramley	Ind	977
Welton no. 1	William Holland	Ind	830
Welton no. 1	Walter Sternfeld	Lab	789
Welton no. 2	Dorothy Richards	Con	1,058
Welton no. 2	George Herrington	Ind	807
Welton no. 2	Brian Fox	Lab	608
Welton no. 2	Royston Hutson	Ind	72
Welton no. 3	Reginald Gaul	Ind	746
Welton no. 3	William Camm	Ind	613
Welton no. 3	George Coles	Con	540
Welton no. 3	Walter Hill	Ind	395
West Kesteven no. 1	Philip Newton	Ind	907
West Kesteven no. 1	Joan Hayes	Con	738
West Kesteven no. 2	Horace Brownlow	Con	1,598
West Kesteven no. 2	Ivan Dawson	Lab	618
West Kesteven no. 3	Capt Sir Anthony Thorold	Con	1,093
West Kesteven no. 3	Terry Bradley	Lab	587
West Kesteven no. 3	Robert Simpson	Ind	583

Source: "Lincoln keeps up its Taverne revolution" and "The new Lincs Council". Lincolnshire Echo. 13 April 1973. p. 9; "Lincolnshire County Election Results 1973–2009". Elections Centre (Plymouth University). Retrieved 2 October 2016.
