= Marc Jones (police commissioner) =

British politician and police commissioner

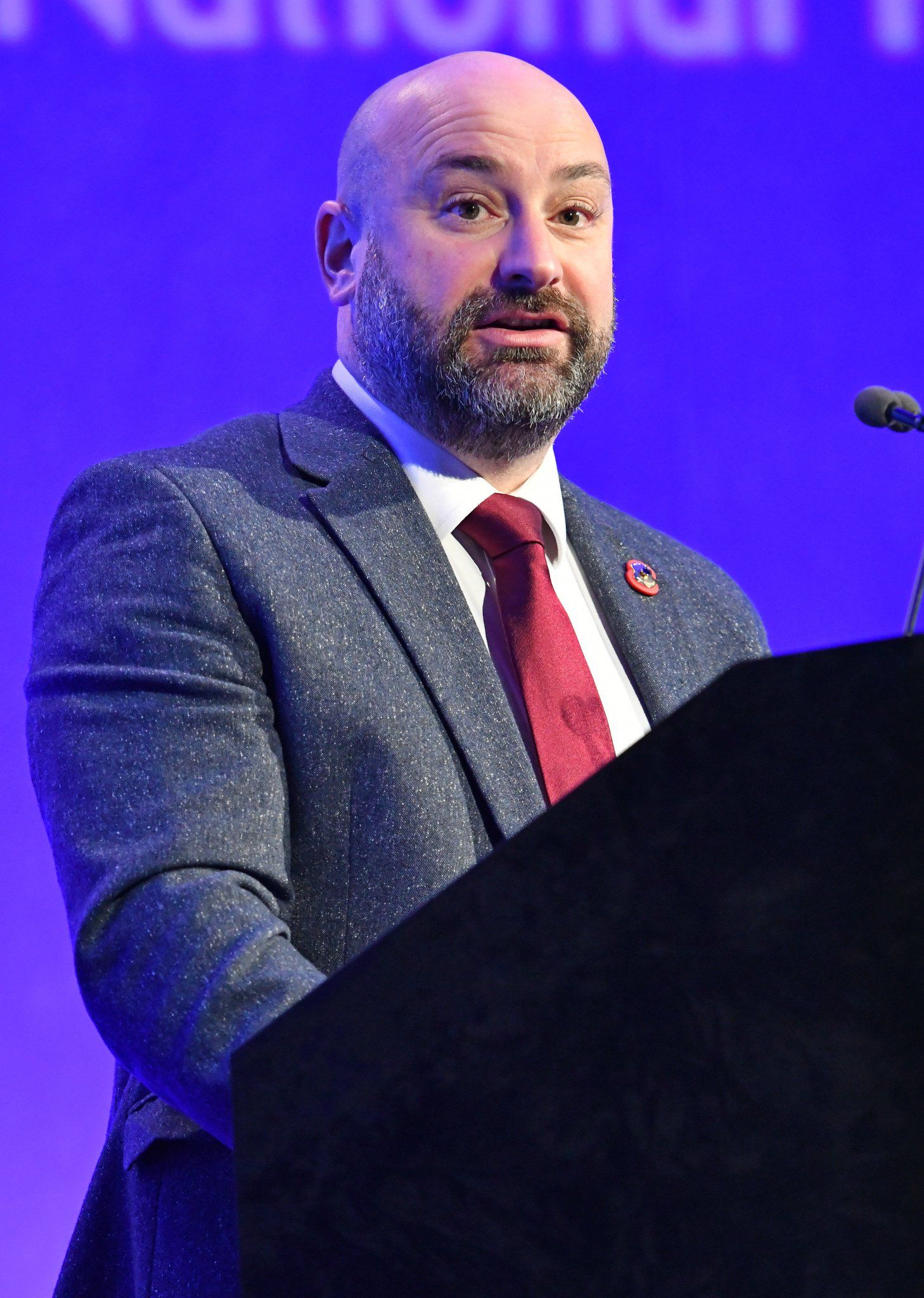
- Jones in 2022

Lincolnshire Police and Crime Commissioner
- Incumbent
- Assumed office 12 May 2016
- Preceded by: Alan Hardwick

Personal details
- Born: April 1972 (age 54) Grimsby, England
- Party: Independent (since 2026)
- Other political affiliations: Conservative (until 2026)
- Website: www.marcjones.org.uk

Marc Stuart Jones (born April 1972) is a British independent, formerly Conservative Party politician, serving as the current Police and Crime Commissioner for Lincolnshire.

== Political career ==
Jones had previously been deputy leader of the City of Lincoln Council, and Executive Councillor for Finance and Property at Lincolnshire County Council. He also stood as the Conservative candidate for the Great Grimsby constituency in the 2015 general election, finishing second with 8,874 votes (26%).

=== Police and Crime Commissioner ===
On 5 May 2016, Jones was elected as Lincolnshire's Police and Crime Commissioner, succeeding the previous incumbent, Alan Hardwick.

Following his election, Jones chose Stuart Tweedale as his deputy, but Lincolnshire's Police and Crime Panel did not endorse the appointment. Jones announced on 8 June 2016 that he would appoint Tweedale to the post despite the Panel's opposition.

In December 2016, Jones appointed Bill Skelly as Lincolnshire's chief constable.

In December 2020, Jones appointed Chris Haward as chief constable, after Skelly had announced his retirement that June.

Jones was re-elected in 2021 with 102,813 of the 177,528 votes cast (59.9%).

In July 2021, he was elected as the chair of Association of Police and Crime Commissioners.

On 1 January 2022, Philip Clark replaced Tweedale in the role of Deputy PCC.

On 1 January 2023, Jones joined the board of the College of Policing after the appointment was confirmed by Home Secretary Suella Braverman.

In February 2024, Jones appointed Paul Gibson as chief constable, due to Haward moving on from the role to a position in the National Police Chiefs' Council.

In March 2024, Jones asked Clark to resign as Deputy PCC, after he was arrested following an "altercation" in a pub near Lincoln.

Jones was re-elected as Lincolnshire Police & Crime Commissioner on 2 May 2024, gaining 36.63% of the votes, from a turnout of 19.08%. He was therefore voted for by less than 7% of the electorate.

In August 2024, he appointed former area manager for Police Now, Sara Munton, as deputy PCC.

Jones put himself forward to be the Conservative candidate for the 2025 Greater Lincolnshire mayoral election and made it onto a six-man shortlist for the position. He withdrew his candidacy just days before the selection event took place in December 2024.

In January 2026 Marc Jones left the Conservative party to serve out the remainder of his term as an independent until police and crime commissioners are abolished in 2028.
