= 1993 Lincolnshire County Council election =

1993 UK local government election

← 1989	6 May 1993	1997 →

All 76 seats to Lincolnshire County Council 39 seats needed for a majority
	First party	Second party
Party	Conservative	Labour
Seats before	39	19
Seats won	31	25
Seat change	▼8	▲6
	Third party	Fourth party
Party	Liberal Democrats	Independent
Seats before	12	5
Seats won	15	5
Seat change	▲3	0
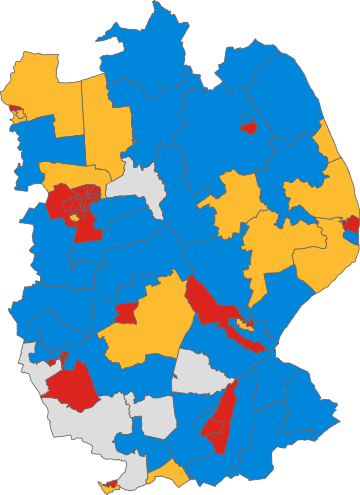
- Map of the results of the election in each division. Colours denote the winning party, as shown in the main table of results.
Council control before election
Conservative
Council control after election
No overall control

The 1993 Lincolnshire County Council election was held on Thursday, 6 May 1993. The whole council of 76 members was up for election and the election resulted in no party winning an overall majority of seats on the council. The Conservative Party lost control of the council for the first time since 1973, winning 31 seats. The Labour Party and the Liberal Democrats both made gains at the expense of the Conservatives, winning 25 and 15 seats respectively.

== Results by division ==
Each electoral division returned one county councillor. The results in each division are shown in the table below.

Division	Candidate	Party	Votes
Alford and Spilsby	Michael Kennedy	Con	1,164
Alford and Spilsby	Richard Sanders	Lib Dem	1,023
Alford Coast	Sydney Chapman	Lib Dem	1,182
Alford Coast	Gordon Wilson	Con	1,106
Bardney and Cherry Willingham	Veronica Ballantine	Con	517
Bardney and Cherry Willingham	Charles Greenaway	Ind	1,486
Bassingham Rural	Lorna Lewinton	Lab	343
Bassingham Rural	Barbara Wells	Ind Con	204
Bassingham Rural	Steven Worth	Lib Dem	870
Bassingham Rural	Bill Wyrill	Con	1,068
Billinghay and Cranwell	James Clarke	Lib Dem	639
Billinghay and Cranwell	Zena Scoley	Con	1,061
Billinghay and Cranwell	Theresa Wadsley	Lab	464
Bolingbroke Castle	Jack Dyde	Lib Dem	-
Boston Rural South	Jean Smith	Con	-
Boston Coastal	Barrie Gosling	Con	-
Boston Witham	Mary Giles	Con	-
Boston Wyberton	Heather Judge	Con	-
Boston West	Albert James Lawson	Con	590
Boston West	Charles Albert Tabbs	Lib Dem	1,331
Boston Fenside	Horace George Bartram	Con	624
Boston Fenside	William Henry Ruck	Lab Co-op	831
Bourne Abbey	Leslie Burke	Lab	485
Bourne Abbey	John Kirkman	Ind	1,248
Bourne Abbey	Michael Silverwood	Con	658
Bourne Castle	Ian Croft	Con	1,371
Bourne Castle	Susan Latham	Lab	350
Bourne Castle	Beverley Wrigley-Pheasant	Lib Dem	970
Caenby	Robin Cracroft-Ely	Con	1,443
Caenby	Roger Hiscox	Lib Dem	1,903
Cliff	Vivian Hager	Ind	286
Cliff	Fay Bush	Lib Dem	241
Cliff	Kelvin Wilson	Ind Con	60
Cliff	Bill Rawson	Con	935
Cliff	Moira Slater	Lab	1,045
Crowland Rural	Helen Rawden	Lib Dem	934
Crowland Rural	Jim Speechley	Con	1,127
Crowland Rural	Valorie Stokes	Lab	588
The Deepings	Mark Grundy	Lib Dem	1,540
The Deepings	John Lewis	Lab	442
The Deepings	Jack Shilling	Con	963
Devon and St John's	Edna Chapman	Con	623
Devon and St John's	Clifford Wells	Lab	533
Devon and St John's	John Wilks	Ind	665
Donington Rural	Sybil Bingham	Ind	1,104
Donington Rural	Amy Teale	Lab	657
Earlesfield	Robin Appleton	Con	186
Earlesfield	John Chadwick	Lab	555
Earlesfield	Derek Vickers	Lib	78
East Elloe	John Fisher	Con	-
Folkingham Rural	Michael Ablewhite	Lab	453
Folkingham Rural	Robert Burns	Lib Dem	553
Folkingham Rural	Giles Halfhead	Ind	513
Folkingham Rural	Martin Hill	Con	1,162
Gainsborough East	William Parry	Con	187
Gainsborough East	Rodney Rainsworth	Lib Dem	672
Gainsborough East	Lee Stewart	Lab	406
Gainsborough North	William Craigs	Ind	454
Gainsborough North	Robert Jones	Lab	593
Gainsborough Rural North	Jacqueline Beckett	Lab	479
Gainsborough Rural North	Maurice French	Lib Dem	1,169
Gainsborough Rural North	Charles Ireland	Con	739
Gainsborough Rural South	Barry Brook	Con	-
Gainsborough South	Judith Hall	Con	218
Gainsborough South	David Lornas	Lib Dem	556
Gainsborough South	Adrian Wootton	Lab	284
Grantham North	Martin Harrigan	Lab	572
Grantham North	Pail Houghton	Lib	296
Grantham North	Herbert Wheat	Con	1,342
Grantham South	Charles Burrows	Lab	1,211
Grantham South	Kathleen Porter	Con	795
Grantham West	Gladys Foster	Con	1,763
Grantham West	John Hurst	Lab	788
Grimsthorpe	Charles Bell	Ind	1,099
Grimsthorpe	Donald Fletcher	Con	796
Harrowby	Elsie Davies	Lab	977
Harrowby	Ian Philips	Con	394
Holbeach	Martin Howard	Lab	774
Holbeach	Julia Taylor	Con	1,270
Holbeach Fen	David Mawby	Con	-
Horncastle and Tetford	John Butterworth	Con	760
Horncastle and Tetford	Fiona Martin	Lib Dem	1,281
Hough	John Hiley	Lib	881
Hough	Philip Newton	Con	937
Hough	Derrick Sansom	Lab	283
Hykeham Forum	Peter Gaul	Ind Con	387
Hykeham Forum	Les Simpson	Con	369
Hykeham Forum	Gordon Witney	Lib Dem	1,527
Lincoln Abbey	Linda Flint	Lab	1,270
Lincoln Abbey	Michael Kaye	Con	312
Lincoln Birchwood	Barry Fippard	Lab	1,744
Lincoln Birchwood	Edmund Strengiel	Con	1,672
Lincoln Boultham	Sybil Daly	Con	393
Lincoln Boultham	Paul North	Green	147
Lincoln Boultham	Ian Smith	Lab	1,171
Lincoln Bracebridge	Robin Meads	Con	991
Lincoln Bracebridge	Sharon Taylor	Lab	1,312
Lincoln Carholme	David Kane	Green	247
Lincoln Carholme	Howard Ockwell	Con	690
Lincoln Carholme	Rob Parker	Lab	1,503
Lincoln Castle	Brian Alford	Green	151
Lincoln Castle	Yvonne Sampson	Con	427
Lincoln Castle	Brenda Taggart	Lab	1,407
Lincoln Longdales	Geoff Burrell	Lab	1,401
Lincoln Longdales	Maureen Gray	Con	529
Lincoln Minster	Anthony Grant	Con	931
Lincoln Minster	Pat Metcalfe	Lab	1,641
Lincoln Minster	Dr John Harding Price	Lib Dem	332
Lincoln Moorland	Norah Baldock	Lab	1,278
Lincoln Moorland	David Chambers	Con	846
Lincoln Park	Reginald Poole	Con	273
Lincoln Park	Paul Taylor	Lab	1,021
Lincoln Park	Kenneth Yates	Green	89
Lincoln Tritton	Irene Adams	Con	382
Lincoln Tritton	John Plant	Lab	1,124
Louth Marsh	Derek Hercock	Ind	864
Louth Marsh	Jack Libell	Con	1,080
Louth North	Julia Baron	Con	702
Louth North	Clive Finch	Lib Dem	609
Louth North	John Herwood	Lab	387
Louth Rural North	Jean Johnson	Con	949
Louth Rural North	Kelvin Wood	Ind Con	580
Louth South	John Henderson	Lib Dem	337
Louth South	Andrea Morris	Con	815
Louth South	David Shepherd	Lab	1,181
Louth Wolds	Rosemary Robinson	Green	880
Louth Wolds	Cyril Turner	Con	971
Mablethorpe	Michael Elford	Lib Dem	1,609
Mablethorpe	Ivy Kidd	Con	787
Metheringham	John Dugging	Lib Dem	406
Metheringham	Rachel Garrick	Lab	792
Metheringham	Eileen Powditch	Con	862
Nettleham and Saxilby	Margaret Morris	Con	509
Nettleham and Saxilby	Sheila Turner	Lib Dem	1,856
North East Kesteven	Howard Sullivan	Lib Dem	490
North East Kesteven	Robert Arnold	Lab	1,146
North East Kesteven	William Bliss	Con	1,413
North Wolds	Malcolm Fytche	Lab	962
North Wolds	Christopher Moorcroft	Con	1,608
Rasen Wolds	Christopher Padley	Green	319
Rasen Wolds	Ian Sharpe	Lib Dem	658
Rasen Wolds	Leslie Wilson	Con	1,102
Skegness North	Mark Anderson	Lab	974
Skegness North	Margaret Hutchinson	Lib Dem	549
Skegness North	Ken Sadler	Con	683
Skegness North	Malcolm Stuart	Ind	125
Skegness South	David Edginton	Con	855
Skegness South	George Gray	Lib Dem	827
Skegness South	Sheila Mackenzie	Lab	468
Skellingthorpe and Hykeham South	Alan Love	Ind Con	171
Skellingthorpe and Hykeham South	Pauline Holt	Con	910
Skellingthorpe and Hykeham South	Michael Flint	Lab	1,154
Skirbeck	Richard Alan Day	Con	815
Skirbeck	Paul Robert Kenny	Lab Co-op	1,196
Sleaford	Dorothy Kench	Con	895
Sleaford	Jarleth McGagh	Lib Dem	847
Sleaford	David Romney	Lab	1,261
Sleaford Rural North	Donald Calthorpe	Ind Dem	123
Sleaford Rural North	Jim Heppell	Lib Dem	659
Sleaford Rural North	Dennis Monk	Con	1,047
Sleaford Rural North	David Suiter	Lab	472
Sleaford Rural South	Dr Edward Brown	Con	676
Sleaford Rural South	David Creasey	Lab	276
Sleaford Rural South	Lesley Pinchbeck	Lib Dem	1,659
Spalding Abbey	Cyril Evans	Lab	1,067
Spalding Abbey	James Hansford	Con	618
Spalding East and Weston	Eric Davies	Lab	1,146
Spalding East and Weston	Gwendoline Moore	Con	985
Spalding North West	Colin Fisher	Con	999
Spalding North West	Robert West	Lab	839
Stamford North	Colin Helstrip	Con	913
Stamford North	Philip Keddell	Lab	1,214
Stamford South	Marguerite Belton	Lib Dem	1,457
Stamford South	Lionel Cunningham	Con	943
Stamford South	Bernard Frisby	Ind	677
Tattershall Castle	Betty Harvey	Con	1,225
Tattershall Castle	Taidhgh Daniel O'Regan	Lib Dem	786
Wainfleet and Burgh	James Dodsworth	Lib Dem	1,374
Wainfleet and Burgh	Shirley Pascoe	Con	408
West Elloe	Peter Bray	Con	833
West Elloe	Brian Davies	Lab	444
Woodhall Span and Wragby	Denis Hoyes	Con	-
