= Lincolnshire Police and Crime Commissioner =

Elected official overseeing Lincolnshire Police

- Incumbent; Marc Jones since 12 May 2016
- Police and crime commissioner of Lincolnshire Police
- Reports to: Lincolnshire Police and Crime Panel
- Appointer: Electorate of Lincolnshire
- Term length: Four years
- Constituting instrument: Police Reform and Social Responsibility Act 2011
- Precursor: Lincolnshire Police Authority
- Inaugural holder: Alan Hardwick
- Formation: 22 November 2012
- Deputy: Deputy Police and Crime Commissioner
- Salary: £68,200
- Website: lincolnshire-pcc.gov.uk

The Lincolnshire Police and Crime Commissioner is the police and crime commissioner, an elected official tasked with setting out the way crime is tackled by Lincolnshire Police in the English County of Lincolnshire. The post was created in November 2012, following an election held on 15 November 2012, and replaced the Lincolnshire Police Authority.

The first incumbent was Independent candidate, Alan Hardwick, who beat Campaign to Stop Politicians Running Policing candidate, David Bowles, by 4,135 votes after a second ballot. Conservative Richard Davies was third and Labour’s Paul Gleeson came fourth.

The current incumbent is Marc Jones, who represents the Conservative Party.

== List of Lincolnshire Police and Crime Commissioners ==
Name	Political party	From	To
Alan Hardwick	Independent	22 November 2012	11 May 2016
Marc Jones	Conservative	12 May 2016	Incumbent

=== Elections ===
2024 Lincolnshire police and crime commissioner election
Party	Candidate	Votes	%	±%
Conservative	Marc Jones	39,639	36.5	−23.2
Labour Co-op	Mike Horder	31,931	29.5	+9.5
Reform	Peter Escreet	15,518	14.3	+10.8
Liberal Democrats	Lesley Rollings	13,380	12.4	+6.4
English Democrat	David Dickason	7,739	7.2	N/A
Turnout		108,207	19.09	
Conservative hold		Swing		
