= Bill Skelly =

British police officer

William Alan Skelly QPM was the Chief Constable of Lincolnshire Police in England. Skelly joined Devon and Cornwall Police from the Police Service of Scotland in December 2013 where he had been Silver Commander for Safety and Security for the 2014 Commonwealth Games in Glasgow.

== Early career ==
Skelly started his police career with Lothian and Borders Police in 1990 and held a number of posts across the force area. In 2004 Skelly completed the Strategic Command Course at the Police Staff College, Bramshill.

In 2005, he was seconded to New Scotland Yard leading the Immigration Crime Team within the Covert Policing Branch of the Metropolitan Police, followed by nine months in charge of the operational strands of the UK campaign targeting criminals involved in the trafficking of women for sexual exploitation. His work in this area was recognised by the award of his second Chief Constable's commendation.

On his return to Lothian and Borders, he led on a number of national policing issues including Liquor Licensing, CBRN, Public Protection and Ports Policing.

In 2007 he participated in the International Visitor Leadership Program organised by the US State Department and was made an honorary Colonel of Kentucky.

== Her Majesty's Inspectorate of Constabulary for Scotland ==
In 2009, Skelly took up post as head of HM Inspector of Constabulary for Scotland by Royal Warrant, on the retirement of Paddy Tomkins HMCIC. He was seconded from Lothian and Borders Police where he was serving as temporary Deputy Chief Constable, having previously been the Assistant Chief Constable (Crime and Operational Support).

== Police Service of Scotland ==
Skelly was appointed as Silver Commander for the Safety and Security operation in support of the 2014 Commonwealth Games at the inception of the Police Service of Scotland.

== Devon and Cornwall Police ==
In December 2013, Skelly was appointed as Deputy Chief Constable of Devon and Cornwall Police, replacing previous Deputy Chief Constable David Zinzan who retired at the end of November 2013.

== Lincolnshire Police ==
Skelly was appointed the role of Chief Constable of the Lincolnshire Police in November 2016, with the role to begin in the February of the next year. Crime commissioner Marc Jones selected Skelly after the announcement that Neil Rhodes would retire in 2017. On 18 June 2020, it was announced that Skelly would retire from policing after 31 years, stepping down on 18 December 2020.

Skelly was awarded the Queen's Police Medal (QPM) in the 2021 New Year Honours.

== Personal life ==
He grew up in the small Angus village of Auchterhouse, was educated locally at Newtyle and Harris Academy, and went on to read mathematics and physics at the University of Edinburgh. Skelly also has a Diploma in Applied Criminology from Cambridge.

He is the chair of Police Sport UK Volleyball Section, and in January 2009 reached the personal milestone of playing in a European match, as a member of the Great Britain Police Team competing against Finland.

== Honours and awards ==

Queen Elizabeth II Golden Jubilee Medal	2002
Queen Elizabeth II Diamond Jubilee Medal	2012
Police Long Service and Good Conduct Medal	2010

Police appointments
Preceded by David Zinzan	Deputy Chief Constable, Devon and Cornwall Police; 2013 –	Incumbent
