= 1977 Lincolnshire County Council election =

1977 UK local government election

Lincolnshire County Council is a non-metropolitan county in the East Midlands of England. It was formed when the Local Government Act 1972 merged the counties of Holland, Kesteven and Lindsey, and held its first election on 12 April 1973.

== Results by Division ==
Division	Candidate	Party	Votes
Boston no. 1	S. Budge	Con	782
Boston no. 1	L. Clarke	Res	633
Boston no. 1	J. Wilkinson	Lib	314
Boston no. 1	H. Wright	Ind	304
Boston no. 1	T. Barnes	Ind	76
Boston no. 2	Mrs H. Towell*	Con	1,088
Boston no. 2	W. Ruck	Lab	619
Boston no. 3	M. Middlebrook*	Ind	(uncontested)
Boston no. 4	R. Jenkin	Con	951
Boston no. 4	Alf Goodson*	Lab	721
Boston Rural no. 1	J. Hildred	Ind	(uncontested)
Boston Rural no. 2	C. Fovargue	Con	(uncontested)
Boston Rural no. 3	R. Upsall	Con	(uncontested)
Bourne	R. Cliffe*	Con	1,271
Bourne	N. Thwaite	Ind	515
Bourne	O. Brown	Lab	366
Caistor Rural no. 1	V. Hudson	Ind	(uncontested)
Caistor Rural no. 2	W. Hall*	Ind	(uncontested)
East Elloe no. 1	J. Fisher	Res	1,488
East Elloe no. 1	Ms S. Garner	Con	773
East Elloe no. 1	Ivor Howes*	Ind	732
East Elloe no. 2	D. Mawby	Ind	1,030
East Elloe no. 2	D. Edwards	Ind	462
East Elloe no. 2	D. Cavendish-Pell	Res	420
East Elloe no. 3	T. Tyler	Res	(uncontested)
East Kesteven no. 1	E. Fairchild*	Con	(uncontested)
East Kesteven no. 2	F. Stockdale	Ind	1,034
East Kesteven no. 2	A. Troop	Con	1,029
East Kesteven no. 3	T. Hall	Con	(uncontested)
Gainsborough Market	E. Salisbury*	Lab	(uncontested)
Gainsborough North	Ms J. Bassett	Con	1,138
Gainsborough North	C. Roofe	Lab	428
Gainsborough South	L. Rainsforth*	Lab	1,015
Gainsborough South	Ms C. Dordery	Con	955
Gainsborough Rural no. 1	R. Chappell	Con	(uncontested)
Gainsborough Rural no. 2	H. Jackson	Con	1,057
Gainsborough Rural no. 2	H. Kitchinson	Lib	791
Gainsborough Rural no. 2	T. Lansbury	Lab	387
Grantham no. 1	H. Nadin	Con	1,370
Grantham no. 1	M. Hudson	Lab	871
Grantham no. 2	J. Wilks	Con	1,047
Grantham no. 2	J. Chadwick	Lab	944
Grantham no. 3	I. Gordon*	Con	1,691
Grantham no. 3	J. Yates	Lab	793
Grantham no. 4	Ms E. Davies*	Lab	1,339
Grantham no. 4	W. Sykes	Con	1,255
Horncastle	Ms L. Sanderson*	Ind	(uncontested)
Horncastle Rural no. 1	D. Hoyes	Con	(uncontested)
Horncastle Rural no. 2	J. Harvey*	Con	(uncontested)
Lincoln Abbey	Ms Y. Bodger	Con	809
Lincoln Abbey	R. Brittan	DLP	808
Lincoln Abbey	J. McKane	Lab	660
Lincoln Boultham	R. Lucas*	Con	699
Lincoln Boultham	J. Hassett	DLP	614
Lincoln Boultham	D. Bessey	Lab	417
Lincoln Bracebridge	F. Hamill	Con	1,559
Lincoln Bracebridge	Ms M. Padget	DLP	687
Lincoln Bracebridge	J. Plant	Lab	521
Lincoln Carholme	J. Spence*	Con	1,136
Lincoln Carholme	F. Goulding	DLP	496
Lincoln Carholme	N. Jackson	Lab	337
Lincoln Castle	F. Eccleshare*	Con	1,575
Lincoln Castle	D. Perring	Lab	509
Lincoln Ermine	Ms A. Naftalin*	Lab	1,077
Lincoln Ermine	D. Miller	Lab	1,044
Lincoln Ermine	R. Barnes*	DLP	927
Lincoln Ermine	L. Davis	DLP	896
Lincoln Ermine	E. Fox	Con	896
Lincoln Hartsholme	Ms J. Sparkes	Con	1,045
Lincoln Hartsholme	K. Wood	Lab	804
Lincoln Hartsholme	Ms M. Richardson	DLP	695
Lincoln Hartsholme	J. Ginniff	Comm	20
Lincoln Minster	Ms D. Richards	Con	1,594
Lincoln Minster	R. Hodson	Lab	809
Lincoln Moorland	Ms E. Jenkins	Con	1,283
Lincoln Moorland	J. Robertson*	Lab	887
Lincoln Moorland	D. Templeman	DLP	627
Lincoln Moorland	C. Hurst	Ind	119
Lincoln Park	F. Allen*	DLP	652
Lincoln Park	P. Roe	Con	469
Lincoln Park	D. Jackson	Lab	447
Louth North	C. Bennett	Ind	(uncontested)
Louth South	C. Baron	Con	851
Louth South	Ms I. Wilkinson*	Ind	698
Louth Rural no. 1	R. Dixon*	Ind	(uncontested)
Louth Rural no. 2	J. Libell	Con	1,451
Louth Rural no. 2	A. Fridlington	Lib	722
Louth Rural no. 3	D. Webb	Con	(uncontested)
Mablethorpe and Sutton	F. Richardson	Con	1,428
Mablethorpe and Sutton	Ms V. Phillips	Ind	540
North Kesteven no. 1	W. Wyrill*	Con	1,155
North Kesteven no. 1	Ms E. Mawer	Ind	424
North Kesteven no. 2	W. Rawson	Con	1,316
North Kesteven no. 2	A. Mettam	Ind	381
North Kesteven no. 2	Ms N. Baldock	Lab	326
North Kesteven no. 3	F. Marshall*	Con	(uncontested)
North Kesteven no. 4	R. Brealey*	Con	1,923
North Kesteven no. 4	Ms A. Jacklin	Ind	360
North Kesteven no. 5	P. Gaul	Con	1,639
North Kesteven no. 5	Ms M. Large*	Lab	1,197
North Kesteven no. 6	H. Johnson*	Con	889
North Kesteven no. 6	G. Lawton	Ind	484
Skegness North	H. Fainlight*	Lib	1,144
Skegness North	A. Preston	Con	971
Skegness South	W. Derbyshire	Con	951
Skegness South	B. Alderson	Lib	522
Sleaford	Ms G. Norris	Con	(uncontested)
South Kesteven no. 1	J. Smith	Con	1,648
South Kesteven no. 1	C. Fretwell	Lab	496
South Kesteven no. 2	M. Hedley Lewis*	Con	(uncontested)
South Kesteven no. 3	Ms J. Wootton*	Con	(uncontested)
Spalding no. 1	D. Guttridge*	Con	(uncontested)
Spalding no. 2	R. King*	Con	782
Spalding no. 2	D. James	Res	580
Spalding no. 3	C. Ford*	Con	(uncontested)
Spalding Rural no. 1	W. Speechley*	Con	(uncontested)
Spalding Rural no. 2	H. Chappell*	Con	(uncontested)
Spalding Rural no. 3	K. Barker	Con	(uncontested)
Spilsby no. 1	F. Hepworth	Con	(uncontested)
Spilsby no. 2	W. Hurdman	Lib	1,154
Spilsby no. 2	C. Rawlinson*	Con	1,032
Spilsby no. 3	H. Simpson*	Con	(uncontested)
Spilsby no. 4	M. Dale	Ind	(uncontested)
Stamford no. 1	I. Allen*	Con	1,613
Stamford no. 1	M. Winslow	Lab	327
Stamford no. 2	Ms E. Randall	Con	1,031
Stamford no. 2	Ms J. Gaffigan	Lab	592
Welton no. 1	E. Bramley*	Ind	(uncontested)
Welton no. 2	P. Heneage	Con	1,948
Welton no. 2	H. Collier	Lib	853
Welton no. 3	R. Gaul*	Con	(uncontested)
West Kesteven no. 1	P. Newton*	Con	(uncontested)
West Kesteven no. 2	H. Brownlow*	Con	(uncontested)
West Kesteven no. 3	A. Thorold*	Con	1,822
West Kesteven no. 3	A. Reed	Lab	426

Source: "Lincolnshire County Election Results 1973–2009". Elections Centre (Plymouth University). Retrieved 30 January 2025.
