= 1989 Lincolnshire County Council election =

1989 UK local government election

← 1985	4 May 1989	1993 →

All 76 seats to Lincolnshire County Council 39 seats needed for a majority
	First party	Second party	Third party
Party	Conservative	Labour	SLD
Seats before	39	14	20
Seats won	39	19	12
Seat change	0	▲5	▼8
	Fourth party	Fifth party
Party	Independent	SDP
Seats before	2	0
Seats won	5	1
Seat change	▲3	▲1
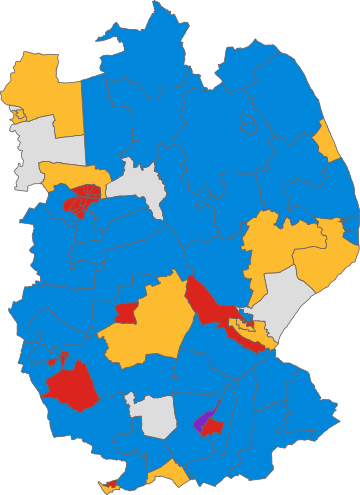
- Map of the results of the election in each division. Colours denote the winning party, as shown in the main table of results.
Council control before election
Conservative
Council control after election
Conservative

The 1989 Lincolnshire County Council election was held on Thursday, 4 May 1989. The whole council of 76 members was up for election and the election resulted in the Conservative Party retaining control of the council and winning the same number of seats as the previous election in 1985, with 39 seats.

== Results by division ==
Each electoral division returned one county councillor. The candidate elected to the council in each electoral division is shown in the table below. "Unopposed" indicates that the councillor was elected unopposed.

Electoral Division	Party	Councillor	Votes
Alford & Spilsby	Conservative	M. Kennedy	1,395
Alford Coast	Conservative	G. Wilson	1,179
Bardney & Cherry Willingham	Independent	C. Greenaway	1,575
Bassingham Rural	Conservative	W. Wyrill	1,584
Billinghay & Cranwell	Conservative	Z. Scoley	1,279
Birchwood	Labour	B. Fippard	1,611
Bolingbroke Castle	Social and Liberal Democrats	J. Dyde	1,585
Boston Rural South	Conservative	J. Smith	1,416
Boston West	Social and Liberal Democrats	C. Tebbs	1,505
Boultham	Labour	L. Wells	1,345
Bourne Abbey	Independent	J. Kirkman	1,224
Bourne Castle	Conservative	I. Croft	1,196
Caenby	Conservative	R. Cracroft-Eley	1,557
Carholme	Labour	R. Parker	1,393
Cliff	Conservative	W. Rawson	1,197
Coastal	Independent	J. Hildred	1,413
Crowland Rural	Conservative	W. Speechley	1,464
Devon & St. Johns	Conservative	E. Chapman	827
Donington Rural	Conservative	S. Bingham	978
Earlesfield	Labour	J. Chadwick	552
East Elloe	Conservative	J. Fisher	1,715
Fenside	Labour	W. Ruck	919
Folkingham Rural	Conservative	B. Lee	1,500
Gainsborough East	Social and Liberal Democrats	R. Rainsforth	1,251
Gainsborough North	Independent	W. Craigs	Unopposed
Gainsborough South	Social and Liberal Democrats	D. Lomas	825
Gainsborough Rural North	Social and Liberal Democrats	M. French	1,412
Gainsborough Rural South	Independent	J. Westgarth	1,827
Grantham North	Conservative	H. Wheat	1,530
Grantham South	Labour	C. Burrows	1,089
Grantham West	Conservative	G. Foster	1,595
Grimsthorpe	Conservative	D. Fletcher	Unopposed
Harrowby	Labour	E. Davies	Unopposed
Holbeach	Conservative	J. Taylor	1,014
Holbeach Fen	Conservative	D. Mawby	1,251
Horncastle & Tetford	Conservative	F. Cupit	1,234
Hough	Conservative	P. Newton	1,262
Hykeham Forum	Conservative	P. Gaul	1,022
Lincoln Abbey	Labour	J. Robertson	1,404
Lincoln Bracebridge	Labour	T. Rook	1,433
Lincoln Castle	Labour	B. Taggart	1,446
Lincoln Moorland	Labour	N. Baldock	1,243
Lincoln Park	Labour	B. Robinson	1,050
Longdales	Labour	G. Burrell	1,527
Louth Marsh	Conservative	J. Libell	1,202
Louth North	Conservative	J. Barkworth	918
Louth Rural North	Conservative	J. Johnson	1,223
Louth South	Conservative	A. Morris	1,058
Louth Wolds	Conservative	C. Turner	1,179
Mablethorpe	Social and Liberal Democrats	W. Baker	1,759
Metheringham	Conservative	E. Powditch	984
Minster	Labour	P. Metcalfe	1,902
Nettleham & Saxilby	Social and Liberal Democrats	S. Turner	1,761
North East Kesteven	Conservative	S. Kenyon	2,400
North Wolds	Conservative	V. Hudson	909
Rasen Wolds	Conservative	L. Wilson	1,306
Skegness North	Conservative	K. Sadler	852
Skegness South	Conservative	D. Edginton	1,012
Skellingthorpe & Hykeham South	Conservative	T. Hargreaves	1,083
Skirbeck	Labour	B. Bisby	984
Sleaford	Labour	D. Romney	1,815
Sleaford Rural North	Conservative	D. Monk	Unopposed
Sleaford Rural South	Social and Liberal Democrats	L. Pinchbeck	1,633
Spalding Abbey	Labour	C. Evans	1,097
Spalding East & Weston	Conservative	G. Moore	1,002
Spalding North West	Social Democrat	A. Newton	1,259
Stamford North	Labour	J. Gaffigan	1,050
Stamford South	Social and Liberal Democrats	M. Belton	1,626
Tattershall Castle	Conservative	B. Harvey	Unopposed
The Deepings	Social and Liberal Democrats	J. Anderson	1,631
Tritton	Labour	C. Goldson	1,418
Wainfleet & Burgh	Social and Liberal Democrats	J. Dodsworth	1,176
West Elloe	Conservative	P. Bray	1,043
Witham	Conservative	M. Giles	1,084
Woodhall Spa & Wragby	Conservative	D. Hoyes	Unopposed
Wyberton	Social and Liberal Democrats	K. Ward	1,170
