= Alan Hardwick =

Lincolnshire Police and Crime Commissioner
- In office 15 November 2012 – 6 May 2016
- Preceded by: Office created
- Succeeded by: Marc Jones

Personal details
- Born: 1949 (age 76–77) Staveley, Derbyshire, England
- Party: Independent
- Profession: Journalist television presenter voice actor Television producer

Alan Hardwick (born 1949) is a former journalist and television presenter. He was the Lincolnshire Police and Crime Commissioner from 2012 to 2016.

== Early life ==
He is the son of a Derbyshire coal miner, living on Chesterfield Road in Staveley. He attended Netherthorpe Grammar School in the town.

== Broadcasting career ==
=== Newspapers ===
Alan Hardwick began his working life as an assistant in the men's clothing department of the Swallows department store (now gone) in Chesterfield. The news editor of the Derbyshire Times had his suits made in the store and another assistant, Vincent Cleary, arranged an interview for Alan at the newspaper. He became a junior reporter in 1965, One of the first stories he covered was the death of Horace Oakley, the Latin master at his old school and the man who first advised him to pursue journalism as a career.

Hardwick left Derbyshire to become a sub-editor with the Wiltshire Gazette and Herald in Swindon in 1969, then moved on to become a news editor for the now defunct Lincolnshire Chronicle. Later he became district editor of the Faversham News in Kent. After a short spell in the southeast he was a sub-editor and sports editor for the Scarborough Evening News.

=== Television ===
From 1973 to 2002 Hardwick was a senior journalist, presenter, producer and director at Yorkshire Television (YTV), presenting the Calendar South news bulletin. He had first encountered YTV when covering a story at Butlin's in Filey. The staff TV presenter, who was travelling by helicopter, was unable to land due to fog, so Alan stepped in.

From 2002 to 2003 he presented his own daily news/current affairs programme on Radio Lincolnshire.

Since 2003 Hardwick has been a self-employed voice-over artist and PR consultant.

== Police and Crime Commissioner ==
On 15 November 2012 Hardwick was elected the first Police and Crime Commissioner for the Lincolnshire Police area. Standing as an independent candidate, winning in the second ballot with a majority of 4,135.
