= David Bowles (chief executive) =

British executive

David Bowles is a British public official who has been Chief Executive of Lincolnshire County Council and chairman of United Lincolnshire Hospitals NHS Trust. He came to particular attention for giving evidence against the leader of Lincolnshire County Council, who was subsequently jailed. He is a member of the whistleblowing charity, the Council of Public Concern at Work.

== Background ==
Bowles was born in Cambridgeshire and has lived in Lincolnshire, England since 1999. He graduated with a science degree. He has worked in the public sector since the 1980s.

== Lincolnshire Councils ==
Bowles was Chief Executive of Lincolnshire County Council from 1998. He subsequently revealed that the Conservative council leader, Jim Speechley, had been using his position to manipulate the route of a new by-pass to increase the value of his land. His evidence led to Speechley being jailed for 18 months. Bowles then had a "strained" relationship with the new Conservative leader, Ian Croft.

On 3 September 2004 Bowles was heckled at a council meeting, as he defended his actions and described the past period as "characterised by smear innuendo and lies" with "bullying and a climate of fear". With his tenure at the county council due to come to an end shortly, Bowles then accepted a position as chief executive of West Lindsey District Council, in north Lincolnshire, to start in September 2004.

In March 2006 councillor Croft (who had resigned as leader of Lincolnshire County Council) was banned from being a county councillor for 15 months for "breaching the code of conduct for people in public office" during his revenge campaign to get rid of Bowles.

== United Lincolnshire Hospitals NHS Trust ==
After three years as chair of United Lincolnshire Hospitals NHS Trust, Bowles resigned in July 2009 after being threatened with suspension for refusing to commit the Trust to meeting national waiting targets. Bowles described the situation as "a substitution of bullying for performance management and an obsession with targets rather than safety".

== Anglesey County Council ==
In September 2009, Bowles became a 'troubleshooter' to sort out the in-fighting on Isle of Anglesey County Council. Bowles was imposed on the council, as an interim managing director, by the Welsh Government and paid via a recruitment company. At £1,160 a day, he became Wales' most expensive public sector worker at the time. Bowles sacked two members of the ruling council group, and the head of education and leisure was forced to resign.

== Other roles ==
In 2012, Bowles stood as a Campaign to Stop Politicians Running Policing candidate for the position of Lincolnshire Police and Crime Commissioner. He was narrowly defeated by another Independent candidate, Alan Hardwick.

Bowles is a member of the Audit Committee of the Chartered Institute of Public Finance and Accountancy. He is also a member of the whistleblowing charity, the Council of Public Concern at Work.
