= 1997 Lincolnshire County Council election =

1997 UK local government election

← 1993	1 May 1997	2001 →

All 76 seats to Lincolnshire County Council 39 seats needed for a majority
	First party	Second party
Party	Conservative	Labour
Seats before	31	25
Seats won	42	19
Seat change	▲11	▼6
	Third party	Fourth party
Party	Liberal Democrats	Independent
Seats before	15	5
Seats won	11	4
Seat change	▼4	▼1
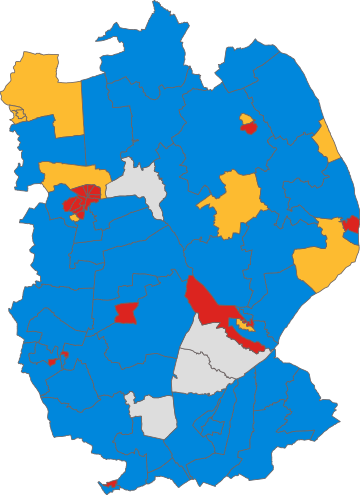
- Map of the results of the election in each division. Colours denote the winning party, as shown in the main table of results.
Council control before election
No overall control
Council control after election
Conservative

The 1997 Lincolnshire County Council election was held on Thursday, 1 May 1997, the same day as the general election. The whole council of 76 members was up for election and the election resulted in the Conservative Party making significant gains and regaining control of the council, winning 42 seats.

== Results by division ==
Each electoral division returned one county councillor. The candidate elected to the council in each electoral division is shown in the table below.

Electoral Division	Party	Councillor	Votes
Alford & Spilsby	Conservative	M. Kennedy	1,945
Alford Coast	Conservative	G. Wilson	2,026
Bardney & Cherry Willingham	Independent	C. Greenaway	1,953
Bassingham Rural	Conservative	W. Wyrill	2,610
Billinghay & Cranwell	Conservative	P. Bradwell	1,846
Birchwood	Labour	B. Fippard	3,607
Bolingbroke Castle	Conservative	I. Simons	2,169
Boston Rural South	Independent	J. Smith	3,324
Boston West	Liberal Democrat	C. Tebbs	1,631
Boultham	Labour	A. Knox	2,133
Bourne Abbey	Independent	J. Kirkman	1,633
Bourne Castle	Conservative	I. Croft	3,640
Caenby	Conservative	C. Ireland	2,544
Carholme	Labour	R. Parker	1,801
Cliff	Conservative	C. Talbot	2,028
Coastal	Conservative	B. Powell	2,006
Crowland Rural	Conservative	W. Speechley	2,622
Devon & St. Johns	Conservative	R. Welby	1,075
Donington Rural	Independent	S. Whyles	1,611
Earlesfield	Labour	A. Davidson	1,272
East Elloe	Conservative	J. Fisher	3,161
Fenside	Labour	F. Gilchrist	1,714
Folkingham Rural	Conservative	M. Hill	2,705
Gainsborough East	Liberal Democrat	R. Rainsforth	1,490
Gainsborough North	Liberal Democrat	L. Bradley	1,225
Gainsborough South	Liberal Democrat	D. Lomas	1,258
Gainsborough Rural North	Liberal Democrat	M. French	2,089
Gainsborough Rural South	Conservative	B. Knight	1,752
Grantham North	Conservative	H. Wheat	2,690
Grantham South	Conservative	E. Chapman	1,536
Grantham West	Conservative	G. Foster	3,494
Grimsthorpe	Conservative	T. Trollope-Bellew	2,032
Harrowby	Labour	C. Wells	1,004
Holbeach	Conservative	J. Taylor	2,330
Holbeach Fen	Conservative	D. Mawby	2,286
Horncastle & Tetford	Liberal Democrat	F. Martin	2,188
Hough	Conservative	N. Spencer-Gregson	2,327
Hykeham Forum	Liberal Democrat	G. Witney	1,547
Lincoln Abbey	Labour	L. Rooney	1,961
Lincoln Bracebridge	Labour	S. Taylor	2,578
Lincoln Castle	Labour	A. Morgan	2,313
Lincoln Moorland	Labour	G. Ellis	2,234
Lincoln Park	Labour	N. Jackson	2,057
Longdales	Labour	N. Murray	2,228
Louth Marsh	Conservative	J. Libell	2,303
Louth North	Liberal Democrat	C. Finch	1,423
Louth Rural North	Conservative	J. Johnson	2,212
Louth South	Labour	D. Bolland	1,683
Louth Wolds	Conservative	S. Roy	1,604
Mablethorpe	Liberal Democrat	M. Morgan	2,961
Metheringham	Conservative	R. Kendrick	1,821
Minster	Labour	P. Metcalfe	3,238
Nettleham & Saxilby	Liberal Democrat	S. Turner	2,266
North East Kesteven	Conservative	W. Bliss	3,017
North Wolds	Conservative	A. Turner	2,752
Rasen Wolds	Conservative	L. Wilson	2,722
Skegness North	Labour	M. Anderson	2,803
Skegness South	Conservative	D. Edginton	1,777
Skellingthorpe & Hykeham South	Conservative	R. Yates	1,853
Skirbeck	Labour	P. Kenny	1,960
Sleaford	Labour	D. Romney	2,430
Sleaford Rural North	Conservative	D. Moor	2,079
Sleaford Rural South	Conservative	B. Young	1,975
Spalding Abbey	Conservative	P. Buffham	1,698
Spalding East & Weston	Conservative	E. Poll	1,346
Spalding North West	Conservative	C. Fisher	2,631
Stamford North	Labour	P. Keddell	1,740
Stamford South	Conservative	C. Helstrip	3,107
Tattershall Castle	Conservative	B. Harvey	2,466
The Deepings	Conservative	P. Robinson	3,430
Tritton	Labour	R. Coupland	1,839
Wainfleet & Burgh	Liberal Democrat	J. Dodsworth	2,385
West Elloe	Conservative	P. Bray	1,895
Witham	Conservative	M. Wright	2,194
Woodhall Spa & Wragby	Conservative	D. Hoyes	2,544
Wyberton	Conservative	H. Judge	1,731
