= 2005 Lincolnshire County Council election =

2005 UK local government election

- 5 May 2005

All 77 seats to Lincolnshire County Council 39 seats needed for a majority
	First party	Second party
Party	Conservative	Labour
Seats before	49	21
Seats won	45	21
Seat change	▼4	0
	Third party	Fourth party
Party	Liberal Democrats	Independent
Seats before	4	3
Seats won	8	3
Seat change	▲4	0
- Map of the results of the election in each division. Colours denote the winning party, as shown in the main table of results.
Council control before election
Conservative
Council control after election
Conservative

The 2005 Lincolnshire County Council election was held on Thursday, 5 May 2005, the same day as the general election. The whole council of 77 members was up for election and the election resulted in the Conservative Party retaining control of the council, winning 45 seats.

== Election result ==
Lincolnshire County Council Elections 2005: Summary Results
Party	Seats	Gains	Losses	Net gain/loss	Seats %	Votes %	Votes	+/−
Conservative	45					42.3%	133,137	
Labour	21					21.9%	68,974	
Liberal Democrats	8					20.5%	64,344	
Independent	3					9.6%	30,073	

== Results by division ==
=== Alford and Sutton ===
Lincolnshire County Council Elections 2005: Alford and Sutton
Party	Candidate	Votes	%	±%
Conservative	Graham Marsh	2,010	45.5	−2.6
Labour	Janet Shuttleworth	1,158	26.2	−0.8
Liberal Democrats	Irene Daw	826	18.7	−6.3
Independent	Eric Vaughan	426	9.6	N.A
Majority		852	19.3	
Turnout		4,420	61.0	
Conservative hold		Swing		

=== Ancholme Cliff ===
Lincolnshire County Council Elections 2005: Ancholme Cliff
Party	Candidate	Votes	%	±%
Conservative	Charles Strange	2,032	54.5	+0.7
Liberal Democrats	Andrew Heathorn	1,138	30.5	−15.8
Independent	Ernest Coleman	556	14.9	N.A
Majority		894	24.0	
Turnout		3,726	66.0	
Conservative hold		Swing		

=== Bardney and Cherry Willingham ===
Lincolnshire County Council Elections 2005: Bardney and Cherry Willingham
Party	Candidate	Votes	%	±%
Conservative	Ian Fleetwood	1,981	44.0	−5.6
Liberal Democrats	Stuart Miller	1,352	30.0	+7.3
Labour	Melanie Tointon	940	20.9	−6.7
UKIP	Sue Ransome	230	5.1	N/A
Majority		629	14.0	
Turnout		4,503	68.0	
Conservative hold		Swing		

=== Bassingham Rural ===
Lincolnshire County Council Elections 2005: Bassingham Rural
Party	Candidate	Votes	%	±%
Conservative	Raymond Phillips	2,194	44.2	−6.0
Liberal Democrats	David Baker	1,657	33.4	−16.4
Labour	Tina Lee	874	17.6	N/A
UKIP	Michael Starky	241	4.9	N/A
Majority		537	10.8	
Turnout		4,966	70.0	
Conservative hold		Swing		

=== Billinghay and Metheringham ===
Lincolnshire County Council Elections 2005: Billinghay and Metheringham
Party	Candidate	Votes	%	±%
Conservative	Patricia Bradwell	1,824	46.6	−9.1
Labour	Theresa Wadsley	1,155	29.5	−14.8
Liberal Democrats	Alan Waddington	934	23.9	N/A
Majority		669	17.1	
Turnout		3,913	62.0	
Conservative hold		Swing		

=== Boston Coastal ===
Lincolnshire County Council Elections 2005: Boston Coastal
Party	Candidate	Votes	%	±%
Conservative	Bryan Powell	1,641	47.6	−3.1
Labour	John Slater	966	28.0	−6.4
UKIP	Jodie Sutton	844	24.5	N/A
Majority		675	19.6	
Turnout		3,451	62.0	
Conservative hold		Swing		

=== Boston East ===
Lincolnshire County Council Elections 2005: Boston East
Party	Candidate	Votes	%	±%
Labour	Sandra Bakewell	1,449	43.2	−18.9
UKIP	Don Ransome	994	29.6	N/A
Conservative	Sally Parker	913	27.2	−10.7
Majority		455	13.6	
Turnout		3,356	52.0	
Labour hold		Swing		

=== Boston Fishtoft ===
Lincolnshire County Council Elections 2005: Boston Fishtoft
Party	Candidate	Votes	%	±%
Liberal Democrats	Ossy Snell	1,875	41.7	+11.9
Conservative	Heather Judge	1,422	31.6	−10.1
Independent	Neil McGregor	1,199	26.7	N/A
Majority		453	10.1	
Turnout		4,496	61.0	
Liberal Democrats gain from Conservative		Swing		

=== Boston North West ===
Lincolnshire County Council Elections 2005: Boston North West
Party	Candidate	Votes	%	±%
Labour	Andrew Bakewell	1,231	38.8	−16.1
Conservative	Bryan Ingham	1,152	36.4	−8.7
UKIP	Gordon Simmonds	786	24.8	N/A
Majority		79	2.4	
Turnout		3,169	50.0	
Labour hold		Swing		

=== Boston Rural ===
Lincolnshire County Council Elections 2005: Boston Rural
Party	Candidate	Votes	%	±%
Conservative	Alan Day	2,782	58.4	+4.6
UKIP	Steven Pearson	1,979	41.6	N/A
Majority		803	16.8	
Turnout		4,761	57.0	
Conservative hold		Swing		

=== Boston South ===
Lincolnshire County Council Elections 2005: Boston South
Party	Candidate	Votes	%	±%
Independent	Richard Austin	1,481	40.4	N/A
Liberal Democrats	Bob Cory	1,060	28.9	+4.0
Conservative	Terence Taylor	860	23.5	−19.3
English Democrat	Stephen Wyatt	264	7.2	N/A
Majority		421	11.5	
Turnout		3,665	61.0	
Independent gain from Conservative		Swing		

=== Boston West ===
Lincolnshire County Council Elections 2005: Boston West
Party	Candidate	Votes	%	±%
Labour	Paul Goodale	1,305	40.7	+2.7
Conservative	Tony Austin	1,123	35.0	+1.7
UKIP	Nicholas Smith	781	24.3	N/A
Majority		182	5.7	
Turnout		3,209	59.0	
Labour hold		Swing		

=== Bourne Abbey ===
Lincolnshire County Council Elections 2005: Bourne Abbey
Party	Candidate	Votes	%	±%
Conservative	Mark Horn	2,362	54.3	+23.9
Labour	Trevor Holmes	1,988	45.7	+23.2
Majority		374	8.6	
Turnout		4,350	62.0	

=== Bourne Castle ===
Lincolnshire County Council Elections 2005: Bourne Castle
Party	Candidate	Votes	%	±%
Conservative	Ian Croft	1,979	47.1	−4.3
Labour	Derrick Crump	1,131	26.9	−1.3
Liberal Democrats	John Binder	1,093	26.0	+5.7
Majority		848	20.2	
Turnout		4,203	69.0	
Conservative hold		Swing		

=== Bracebridge Heath and Waddington ===
Lincolnshire County Council Elections 2005: Bracebridge Heath and Waddington
Party	Candidate	Votes	%	±%
Conservative	Christine Talbot	2,276	43.2	−11.2
Labour	Jerome O'Brien	1,811	34.4	−11.2
Independent	Ivan Hall	781	14.8	N/A
UKIP	Malcolm Skeels	401	7.6	N/A
Majority		465	8.8	
Turnout		5,269	64.0	
Conservative hold		Swing		

=== Branston and Navenby ===
Lincolnshire County Council Elections 2005: Branston and Navenby
Party	Candidate	Votes	%	±%
Independent	Marianne Overton	2,771	54.8	+17.7
Conservative	Derek Duncan	1,384	27.4	−8.0
Labour	Keith Haw	902	17.8	−9.6
Majority		1,387	27.4	
Turnout		5,057	70.0	
Independent hold		Swing		

=== Colsterworth Rural ===
Lincolnshire County Council Elections 2005: Colsterworth Rural
Party	Candidate	Votes	%	±%
Conservative	Edward Chapman	1,797	53.5	−9.6
Labour	Robert Shorrock	859	25.6	N/A
Liberal Democrats	Ismail Jalili	700	20.9	−16.0
Majority		938	27.9	
Turnout		3,356	66.0	
Conservative hold		Swing		

=== Crowland and Whaplode ===
Lincolnshire County Council Elections 2005: Crowland and Whaplode
Party	Candidate	Votes	%	±%
Conservative	Paul Przyszlak	2,698	65.5	+2.6
Liberal Democrats	Kathleen Tanner	1,421	34.5	+20.2
Majority		1,277	31.0	
Turnout		4,119	66.0	
Conservative hold		Swing		

=== Deeping St James ===
Lincolnshire County Council Elections 2005: Deeping St James
Party	Candidate	Votes	%	±%
Labour	Philip Dilks	1,752	51.8	−6.7
Conservative	Bryan Helyar	1,632	48.2	+6.7
Majority		120	3.6	
Turnout		3,384	65.0	
Labour hold		Swing		

=== Donington Rural ===
Lincolnshire County Council Elections 2005: Donington Rural
Party	Candidate	Votes	%	±%
Conservative	Amanda Puttick	2,576	62.9	+17.7
Liberal Democrats	Samantha Turner	1,517	37.1	N/A
Majority		1,059	25.8	
Turnout		4,093	67.0	

=== Folkingham Rural ===
Lincolnshire County Council Elections 2005: Folkingham Rural
Party	Candidate	Votes	%	±%
Conservative	Martin Hill	3,013	61.7	+5.2
Liberal Democrats	Christine Brough	1,871	38.3	+22.8
Majority		1,142	23.4	
Turnout		4,884	68.0	
Conservative hold		Swing		

=== Gainsborough Hill ===
Lincolnshire County Council Elections 2005: Gainsborough Hill
Party	Candidate	Votes	%	±%
Liberal Democrats	Michael Tinker	1,255	43.6	−35.2
Labour	Lynne Gray	1,016	35.3	N/A
Conservative	Jeffrey Summers	609	21.1	−9.9
Majority		239	8.3	
Turnout		2,880	49.0	
Liberal Democrats hold		Swing		

=== Gainsborough Rural South ===
Lincolnshire County Council Elections 2005: Gainsborough Rural South
Party	Candidate	Votes	%	±%
Liberal Democrats	Peter Heath	2,945	54.5	+20.1
Conservative	Brian Knight	2,463	45.5	−0.7
Majority		482	9.0	
Turnout		5,408	67.0	
Liberal Democrats gain from Conservative		Swing		

=== Gainsborough Trent ===
Lincolnshire County Council Elections 2005: Gainsborough Trent
Party	Candidate	Votes	%	±%
Liberal Democrats	Patrick O'Connor	1,868	50.3	+12.7
Labour	Patrick Vaughan	923	24.8	−12.1
Conservative	William Parry	726	19.5	−5.9
UKIP	Mark Jones	199	5.4	N/A
Majority		945	25.5	
Turnout		3,716	51.0	
Liberal Democrats hold		Swing		

=== Grantham Barrowby ===
Lincolnshire County Council Elections 2005: Grantham Barrowby
Party	Candidate	Votes	%	±%
Labour	Alan Davidson	1,646	52.6	−4.5
Conservative	Pamela Bosworth	1,486	47.4	+4.5
Majority		160	5.2	
Turnout		3,132	53.0	
Labour hold		Swing		
