= 2001 Lincolnshire County Council election =

2001 UK local government election

- 7 June 2001

All 77 seats to Lincolnshire County Council 39 seats needed for a majority
	First party	Second party
Party	Conservative	Labour
Seats before	42	19
Seats won	49	21
Seat change	▲7	▲2
	Third party	Fourth party
Party	Liberal Democrats	Independent
Seats before	11	4
Seats won	4	3
Seat change	▼7	▼1
- Map of the results of the election in each division. Colours denote the winning party, as shown in the main table of results.
Council control before election
Conservative
Council control after election
Conservative

The 2001 Lincolnshire County Council election was held on Thursday, 7 June 2001, the same day as the general election. Boundary changes to the electoral divisions of the county took effect at this election, with the number of seats increased by 1. The whole council of 77 members was up for election and the election resulted in the Conservative Party retaining control of the council, winning 49 seats.

== Results by division ==
Each electoral division returned one county councillor. The candidate elected to the council in each electoral division is shown in the table below. "Unopposed" indicates that the councillor was elected unopposed.

Electoral Division	Party	Councillor	Votes
Alford & Sutton	Conservative	M. Kennedy	1,650
Ancholme Cliff	Conservative	C. Strange	1,837
Bardney & Cherry Willingham	Conservative	I. Fleetwood	2,078
Bassingham Rural	Conservative	W. Wyrill	2,204
Billinghay & Metheringham	Conservative	P. Bradwell	1,976
Boston Coastal	Conservative	B. Powell	1,724
Boston East	Labour	P. Kenny	2,069
Boston Fishtoft	Conservative	H. Judge	1,823
Boston North West	Labour	F. Gilchrist	1,741
Boston Rural	Conservative	R. Day	2,270
Boston South	Conservative	T. Taylor	1,518
Boston West	Labour	P. Goodale	1,228
Bourne Abbey	Independent	J. Kirkman	1,566
Bourne Castle	Conservative	I. Croft	2,103
Bracebridge Heath & Waddington	Conservative	C.A. Talbot	2,460
Branston & Navenby	Independent	M. Overton	1,695
Colsterworth Rural	Conservative	E. Chapman	1,979
Crowland & Whaplode	Conservative	W. Speechley	2,527
Deeping St. James	Labour	P. Dilks	1,954
Donington Rural	Independent	S. Whyles	2,179
Folkingham Rural	Conservative	M. Hill	2,550
Gainsborough Hill	Liberal Democrat	M. Tinker	2,236
Gainsborough Rural South	Conservative	B. Knight	2,259
Gainsborough Trent	Liberal Democrat	P. O'Connor	1,420
Grantham Barrowby	Labour	A. Davidson	1,848
Grantham East	Labour	C. Wells	2,158
Grantham North	Conservative	H. Wheat	2,410
Grantham North West	Conservative	E. Chapman	1,321
Grantham South	Labour	M. Williams	1,455
Heighington & Washingborough	Conservative	W. Bliss	1,839
Holbeach	Conservative	J. Taylor	Unopposed
Holbeach Rural	Conservative	W. Webb	2,369
Horncastle & Tetford	Conservative	W. Aron	2,337
Hough	Conservative	M. Spencer-Gregson	2,820
Hykeham Forum	Liberal Democrat	J. Marriott	1,626
Ingoldmells Rural	Conservative	G. Wilson	1,997
Lincoln Birchwood	Labour	B. Flippard	1,408
Lincoln Boultham	Labour	T. Rook	2,057
Lincoln Bracebridge	Labour	B. Robinson	2,189
Lincoln East	Labour	R. Renshaw	1,950
Lincoln Glebe	Labour	A. Taylor	1,671
Lincoln Hartsholme	Labour	R. Coupland	2,173
Lincoln Moorland	Labour	G. Ellis	1,980
Lincoln North	Labour	L. Burke	2,490
Lincoln Park	Labour	N. Jackson	1,537
Lincoln West	Labour	R. Parker	2,134
Louth Marsh	Conservative	J. Libell	2,242
Louth North	Conservative	P. Watson	1,052
Louth Rural North	Conservative	J. Johnson	2,046
Louth South	Labour	J. Hough	1,728
Louth Wolds	Conservative	S. Roy	1,934
Mablethorpe	Labour	A. Howard	1,418
Market & West Deeping	Conservative	P. Robinson	1,741
Market Rasen Wolds	Conservative	B. Thoebald	1,419
Nettleham & Saxilby	Liberal Democrat	R. Sellars	2,124
North Wolds	Conservative	A. Turner	2,398
Ruskington & Cranwell	Conservative	I. Cartwright	2,113
Scotter Rural	Conservative	C. Underwood-Frost	1,810
Skegness North	Labour	M. Anderson	2,116
Skegness South	Conservative	D. Edginton	1,616
Skellingthorpe & Hykeham South	Conservative	R. Yates	1,605
Sleaford	Conservative	D. Dickinson	1,390
Sleaford Rural South	Conservative	B. Young	2,783
Sleaford West & Leasingham	Conservative	B. Singleton	1,792
Spalding East & Moulton	Conservative	E. Poll	2,720
Spalding Elloe	Conservative	P. Bray	2,247
Spalding South	Conservative	N. Carter	2,242
Spalding West	Conservative	C. Fisher	2,269
Spilsby Fen	Conservative	I. Stimson	1,391
Stamford North	Labour	C. Wood	1,679
Stamford Rural	Conservative	T. Trollope-Bellew	2,455
Stamford West	Conservative	C. Helstrip	1,338
Sutton Elloe	Conservative	J. Fisher	2,537
Tattershall Castle	Conservative	B. Harvey	2,361
Wainfleet & Burgh	Conservative	N. Cooper	1,658
Welton Rural	Conservative	C. Ireland	2,493
Woodhall Spa & Wragby	Conservative	D. Hoyes	2,632
