= Ian Croft =

Ian Mitchell Croft (died 28 September 2016) was a Conservative local politician who served as Leader of Lincolnshire County Council from 2002 to 2005.

== Career ==
A resident of Lound, near Bourne, Croft was first elected onto the Lincolnshire County Council for the Bourne Castle division in May 1985. After serving as Chairman of the Highways and Planning Committee, Croft was the council's Conservative Leader between 2002 and 2005, following the resignation of Jim Speechley, who was later jailed for misconduct in a public office, after not declaring a conflict of interest that land he owned would increase significantly in value as a result of a new bypass road he had promoted. In March 2005, Croft himself resigned as leader (his entire executive board also resigned their positions) following an Audit Commission report which called the council's leadership "weak" and "unlikely to improve without help"; two Lincolnshire Members of Parliament, Conservatives Edward Leigh and Douglas Hogg, called for his resignation, while the Lincolnshire Echo devoted five pages to the report's findings.

The following March, Croft, who had been re-elected a county councillor despite his resignation as Leader, was banned from being a County Councillor for 15 months for "breaching the code of conduct for people in public office" by the Standards Board of England and Wales; the Board heard that Croft sought revenge against the council's Chief Executive, David Bowles, who testified against Speechley. Croft was found to have "consistently undermined Mr Bowles in the media" and that he had "failed to support Mr Bowles on several occasions", including an incident in 2003 when he wrote to the council's solicitors asking them to terminate Bowles's contract. Bowles left his post in 2004 arguing that his job had "become impossible".

Croft was therefore forced to resign from the council in March 2006 and did not sit on it again. He died, aged 81, on 28 September 2016, and was survived by his wife Jean, a son and a granddaughter.

Civic offices
Preceded by Jim Speechley	Leader of Lincolnshire County Council; 2002–2005	Succeeded by Martin Hill
