= 1985 Lincolnshire County Council election =

UK local government election

- 2 May 1985

All 76 seats to Lincolnshire County Council 39 seats needed for a majority
	First party	Second party	Third party
Party	Conservative	Alliance	Labour
Seats before	42	12	13
Seats won	39	20	14
Seat change	▼3	▲8	▲1
	Fourth party	Fifth party
Party	Independent	RA
Seats before	9	0
Seats won	2	1
Seat change	▼7	▲1
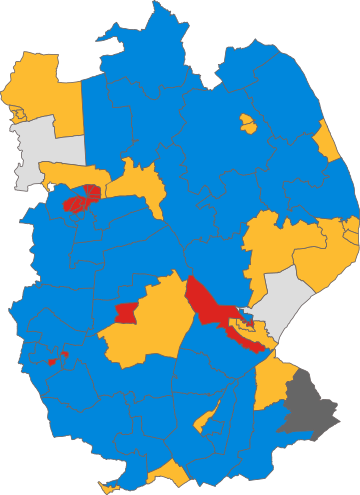
- Map of the results of the election in each division. Colours denote the winning party, as shown in the main table of results.
Council control before election
Conservative
Council control after election
Conservative

The 1985 Lincolnshire County Council election was held on Thursday, 2 May 1985. The whole council of 76 members was up for election and the election resulted in the Conservative Party retaining control of the council with a majority of 2, winning 39 seats.

== Results by division ==
Each electoral division returned one county councillor. The candidate elected to the council in each electoral division is shown in the table below.

Electoral Division	Party	Councillor	Votes
Alford & Spilsby	Conservative	M. Kennedy	1,194
Alford Coast	Conservative	J. Martin	885
Bardney & Cherry Willingham	SDP–Liberal Alliance	P. Dodds	924
Bassingham Rural	Conservative	W. Wyrill	1,545
Billinghay & Cranwell	Conservative	Z. Scoley	1,250
Birchwood	Labour	P. Robinson	1,083
Bolingbroke Castle	SDP–Liberal Alliance	J. Dyde	1,171
Boston Rural South	Conservative	J. Smith	1,344
Boston West	SDP–Liberal Alliance	T. Cummings	1,102
Boultham	Labour	L. Wells	1,110
Bourne Abbey	Conservative	D. Fisher	841
Bourne Castle	Conservative	I. Croft	1,026
Caenby	Conservative	R. Eley	1,488
Carholme	Conservative	S. Campbell	953
Cliff	Conservative	W. Rawson	1,177
Coastal	Independent	J. Hildred	921
Crowland Rural	Conservative	W. Speechley	1,230
Devon & St. Johns	Conservative	E. Chapman	879
Donington Rural	Conservative	S. Bingham	1,287
Earlesfield	Labour	J. Chadwick	822
East Elloe	Residents' association	J. Fisher	1,727
Fenside	Labour	J. Lowery	1,037
Folkingham Rural	Conservative	B. Lee	1,160
Gainsborough East	SDP–Liberal Alliance	R. Rainsforth	993
Gainsborough North	SDP–Liberal Alliance	W. Craigs	610
Gainsborough South	SDP–Liberal Alliance	D. Lomas	717
Gainsborough Rural North	SDP–Liberal Alliance	M. French	1,445
Gainsborough Rural South	Independent	J. Westgarth	1,347
Grantham North	Conservative	M. Spencer-Gregson	1,555
Grantham South	Conservative	H. Nadin	1,259
Grantham West	Conservative	G. Foster	1,328
Grimsthorpe	Conservative	D. Fletcher	1,129
Harrowby	Labour	E. Davies	1,205
Holbeach	SDP–Liberal Alliance	C. Pearl	640
Holbeach Fen	Conservative	D. Mawby	1,109
Horncastle & Tetford	Conservative	F. Cupit	1,152
Hough	Conservative	P. Newton	1,247
Hykeham Forum	Conservative	P. Gaul	1,091
Lincoln Abbey	Labour	J. Robertson	1,520
Lincoln Bracebridge	Conservative	E. Jenkins	1,259
Lincoln Castle	Labour	J. Ward	1,445
Lincoln Moorland	Labour	N. Baldock	984
Lincoln Park	Labour	A. McFarlane	1,163
Longdales	Labour	G. Burrell	1,282
Louth Marsh	Conservative	J. Libell	1,092
Louth North	SDP–Liberal Alliance	J. Sellick	1,410
Louth Rural North	Conservative	J. Johnson	878
Louth South	SDP–Liberal Alliance	M. Birmingham	1,452
Louth Wolds	Conservative	C. Turner	1,032
Mablethorpe	SDP–Liberal Alliance	W. Baker	1,766
Metheringham	Conservative	E. Powditch	796
Minster	Labour	P. Metcalfe	1,724
Nettleham & Saxilby	SDP–Liberal Alliance	S. Turner	1,427
North East Kesteven	Conservative	P. Richardson	1,420
North Wolds	Conservative	V. Hudson	1,357
Rasen Wolds	Conservative	L. Wilson	1,361
Skegness North	SDP–Liberal Alliance	H. Fianlight	941
Skegness South	SDP–Liberal Alliance	K. Holland	995
Skellingthorpe & Hykeham South	Conservative	B. Gledhill	1,058
Skirbeck	Labour	B. Bisby	793
Sleaford	Labour	J. Pratt	1,418
Sleaford Rural North	Conservative	D. Monk	1,465
Sleaford Rural South	SDP–Liberal Alliance	L. Pinchbeck	1,355
Spalding Abbey	Conservative	D. Gutteridge	686
Spalding East & Weston	Conservative	R. King	1,011
Spalding North West	SDP–Liberal Alliance	A. Newton	1,066
Stamford North	Conservative	W. Simpson	763
Stamford South	SDP–Liberal Alliance	M. Belton	1,440
Tattershall Castle	Conservative	B. Harvey	1,198
The Deepings	SDP–Liberal Alliance	J. Anderson	2,349
Tritton	Labour	I. Goldingson	1,089
Wainfleet & Burgh	SDP–Liberal Alliance	J. Dodsworth	1,271
West Elloe	Conservative	G. Walker	1,055
Witham	Conservative	M. Giles	1,026
Woodhall Spa & Wragby	Conservative	D. Hoyes	1,315
Wyberton	SDP–Liberal Alliance	K. Ward	1,099
