= Jim Speechley =

British politician (died 2021)

William James Speechley (1936/7 – 19 April 2021) was a British politician. He was a Conservative Party councillor in Crowland and leader of the Lincolnshire County Council. He was appointed a CBE in 1992, which was later stripped after his 2004 conviction for "misconduct in a public office" related to the route of the A1073 road (Spalding to Eye bypass), after not declaring a conflict of interest that land he owned would increase significantly in value as a result. It was confirmed in court that he instructed a planning officer to alter the road route to benefit his own land's value to a considerable extent. He was sentenced to 18 months in jail.

In March 2006 Speechley's successor as council leader, Ian Croft was banned from being a county councillor for 15 months for "breaching the code of conduct for people in public office" during his campaign to get rid of chief executive, David Bowles, who had initially reported Speechley to the police and given evidence against him.

Speechley died on 19 April 2021 at the age of 84.

Civic offices
Preceded by Robert Parker	Leader of Lincolnshire County Council; 1997–2002	Succeeded by Ian Croft
