= Lincolnshire County Council =

Elected administrative body for the county

Type
- Type: Non-metropolitan county

Leadership
- Chair: Mike Beecham, Reform UK since 22 May 2026
- Leader: Sean Matthews, Reform UK since 23 May 2025
- Chief Executive: Andrew Crookham since March 2026

Structure
- Seats: 70 seats
- Graph of the party split among 70 seats.
- Political groups: Administration (42) Reform (42) Other parties (28) Conservative (15) Liberal Democrats (5) Labour (2) Independent (6)
- Length of term: 4 years

Elections
- Voting system: First-past-the-post
- Last election: 1 May 2025

Meeting place
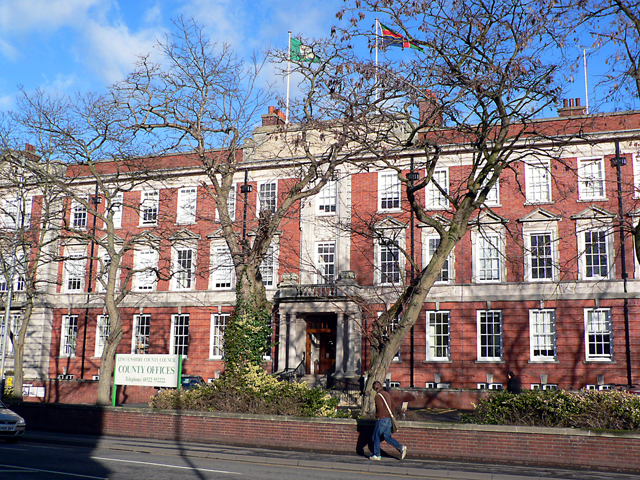
- County Offices, Newland, Lincoln, LN1 1YL

Website
- www.lincolnshire.gov.uk

Lincolnshire County Council is the county council that governs the non-metropolitan county of Lincolnshire in England. The non-metropolitan county is smaller than the ceremonial county; the latter additionally includes North Lincolnshire and North East Lincolnshire which are both unitary authorities and therefore independent from the county council.

== History ==
Lincolnshire was one of the historic counties of England. From the middle ages it was administered in three parts, called Holland, Kesteven and Lindsey, each of which had their own quarter sessions. From 1409 the city of Lincoln was also an independent county corporate. When elected county councils were created in 1889 taking over the administrative functions of the quarter sessions, each of Lincolnshire's three parts became a separate administrative county with its own county council, and Lincoln was made a county borough, maintaining its independence.

That arrangement continued until 1974 when the Local Government Act 1972 abolished Holland County Council, Kesteven County Council and Lindsey County Council and the County Borough of Lincoln, creating a Lincolnshire County Council for the first time.

In 2025 the council became a member of the new Greater Lincolnshire Combined County Authority, along with North Lincolnshire Council and North East Lincolnshire Council. The combined authority is chaired by the directly-elected Mayor of Greater Lincolnshire.

== Governance ==
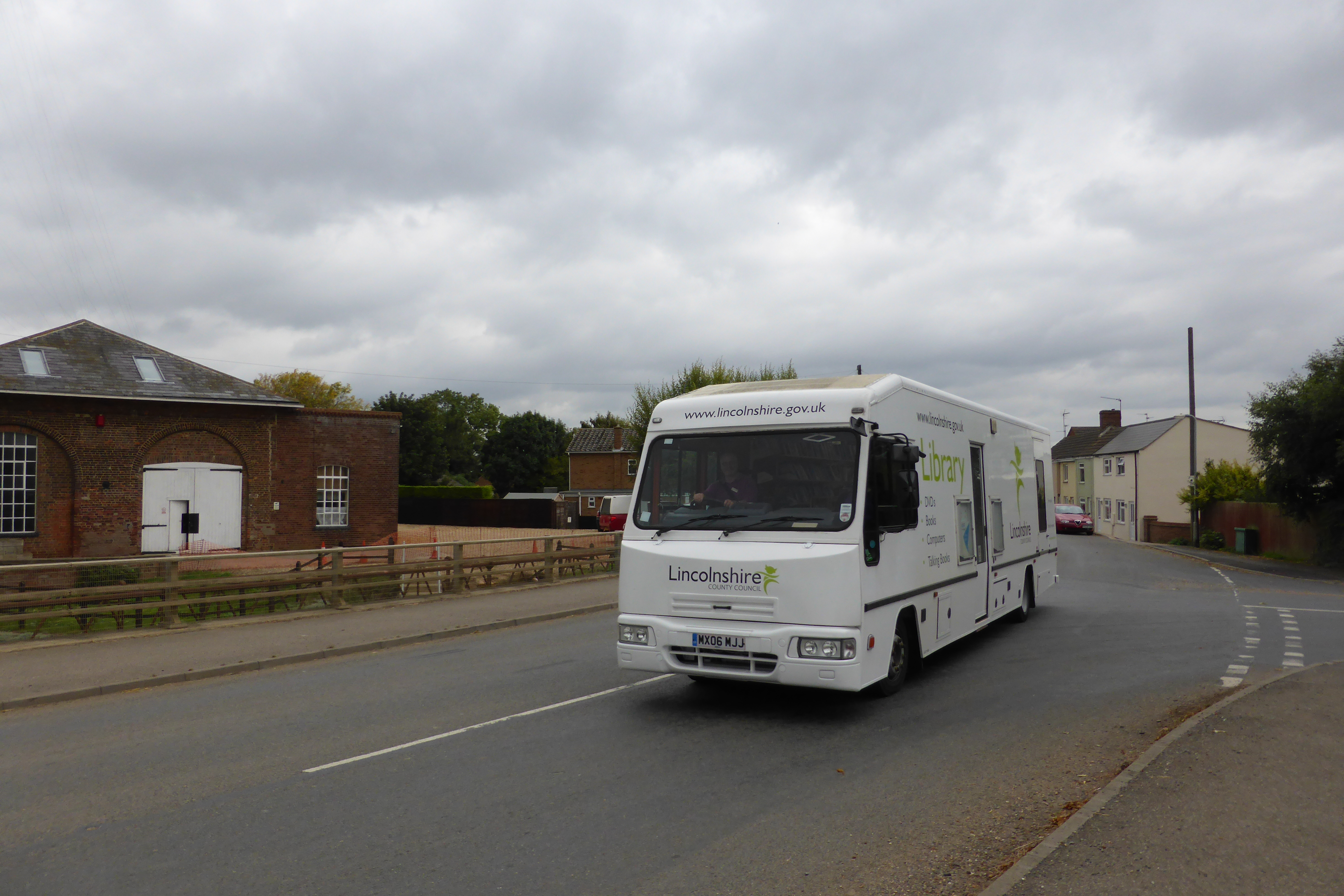
Lincolnshire mobile library at Pode Hole.

Lincolnshire County Council provides county-level services. District-level services are provided by the area's seven district councils:

- Boston
- Lincoln
- East Lindsey
- North Kesteven
- South Holland
- South Kesteven
- West Lindsey

Much of the county is also covered by civil parishes, which form a third tier of local government.

=== Political control ===
The council has been under Reform UK majority control since 2025.

The first election to the council was held in 1973, initially operating as a shadow authority alongside the outgoing authorities before coming into its powers on 1 April 1974. Political control of the council since 1974 has been as follows:

Party in control	Years
No overall control	1974–1977
Conservative	1977–1993
No overall control	1993–1997
Conservative	1997–2013
No overall control	2013–2017
Conservative	2017–2025
Reform	2025–present

=== Leadership ===
The leaders of the council since 1974 have been:

Councillor	Party	From	To
Anthony Thorold	Conservative	1 April 1974	May 1981
David Guttridge	Conservative	May 1981	8 Sep 1987
Bill Wyrill	Conservative	Nov 1987	May 1993
Rob Parker	Labour	May 1993	May 1997
Jim Speechley	Conservative	May 1997	13 Sep 2002
Ian Croft	Conservative	4 Oct 2002	18 Mar 2005
Martin Hill	Conservative	24 Mar 2005	May 2025
Sean Matthews	Reform	23 May 2025	

=== Composition ===
Following the 2025 election, and subsequents changes of allegiance up to May 2026, the composition of the council was:

Party	Seats
Reform	42
Conservative	15
Liberal Democrats	5
Labour	2
Independent	6
Total	70

Four of the independent councillors form the Independent Group.

== Executive ==
Party key	Reform	Liberal Democrats

Post	Party	Councillor	Ward
Chairman and Deputy Chairman
Chairman of the Council	Liberal Democrats	Stephen Bunney	Market Rasen Wolds
Deputy Chairman of the Council	Reform	Mike Beecham	Alford and Sutton
Leader and Deputy Leader
Leader of the council	Reform	Sean Matthews	Tattershall Castle
Deputy Leader and Executive member for Communities	Reform	Robert Gibson	Spalding East
Cabinet members
Executive Councillor for Environment	Reform	Danny Brookes	Ingoldmells Rural
Executive Councillor for Resources	Reform	Thomas Catton	Louth South
Executive Councillor for Highways and Transport	Reform	Michael Cheyne	Boston West
Executive Councillor for Adult Care and Health	Reform	Steve Clegg	Sleaford
Executive Councillor for Growth	Reform	Liam Kelly	Swallow Beck and Witham
Executive Councillor for Community Safety	Reform	Alex McGonigle	Louth Wolds
Executive Councillor for Children's Services	Reform	Natalie Oliver	Woodhall Spa and Wragby

== Elections ==
Since the last boundary changes in 2017 the county has been divided into 70 electoral divisions, each of which elects one councillor. Elections are held every four years.

== Premises ==
The council has its main offices and meeting place at County Offices on Newland in Lincoln. The building was built in 1926–1932 as the headquarters for the former Lindsey County Council, one of Lincolnshire County Council's predecessors.

== Chief executives ==
Chief executives have included:

- 1973–1979: David Drury Macklin
- 1983–1995: Robert John Dudley Proctor
- 1995–1998: Jill Helen Barrow, who was the first woman chief executive of a county council in England.
- 1999–2004: David Bowles
- 2005–2018: Tony McArdle
- 2018: Keith Ireland
- 2020–2026: Debbie Barnes
