= South Holland District Council elections =

Local government elections in Lincolnshire, England

South Holland District Council in Lincolnshire, England is elected every four years. Since the last boundary changes in 2007 the council has comprised 37 councillors representing 18 wards, with each ward electing one, two or three councillors.

== Council elections ==
- 1973 South Holland District Council election
- 1976 South Holland District Council election
- 1979 South Holland District Council election (New ward boundaries)
- 1983 South Holland District Council election
- 1987 South Holland District Council election
- 1991 South Holland District Council election (District boundary changes took place but the number of seats remained the same)
- 1995 South Holland District Council election
- 1999 South Holland District Council election (New ward boundaries)
- 2003 South Holland District Council election
- 2007 South Holland District Council election (New ward boundaries)
- 2011 South Holland District Council election
- 2015 South Holland District Council election
- 2019 South Holland District Council election
- 2023 South Holland District Council election

== Election results ==
	Overall control	Conservative	Labour	Lincolnshire Independents	UKIP	SH Independents	Independent
2023	Conservative	19	0	0	0	15	3
2019	Conservative	24	0	0	0	0	13
2015	Conservative	28	0	0	2	0	7
2011	Conservative	25	0	1	0	0	11
2007	Conservative	26	0	0	0	0	11
2003	Conservative	26	1	0	0	0	11

== District result maps ==
2003 results map

2007 results map

2011 results map

2015 results map

2019 results map

2023 results map

== By-elections ==
=== 2003-2007 ===
Spalding St John's By-Election 19 May 2005
Party	Candidate	Votes	%	±%
Independent		349	43.6	+43.6
Conservative		270	33.7	−23.1
Independent		182	22.7	+22.7
Majority		79	9.9	
Turnout		801		
Independent gain from Conservative		Swing		

=== 2007-2011 ===
Moulton, Weston and Cowbit By-Election 2 April 2009
Party	Candidate	Votes	%	±%
Conservative	Rodney Grocock	937	81.1	+28.6
Liberal Democrats	Anne Ramkaran	219	18.9	+18.9
Majority		79	9.9	
Turnout		801		
Conservative hold		Swing		

=== 2011-2015 ===
Fleet By-Election 2 August 2012
Party	Candidate	Votes	%	±%
Conservative	Peter Coupland	285	55.0	−3.9
Independent	Val Gemmell	233	45.0	+45.0
Majority		52	10.0	
Turnout		518		
Conservative hold		Swing		

Long Sutton By-Election 2 August 2012
Party	Candidate	Votes	%	±%
Independent	Andrew Tennant	946	55.5	+55.5
Conservative	Jack Tyrrell	757	44.5	+3.5
Majority		189	11.1	
Turnout		1,703		
Independent hold		Swing		

=== 2015-2019 ===
Whaplode and Holbeach St John's By-Election 16 November 2017
Party	Candidate	Votes	%	±%
Conservative	Janet Whitbourn	541	78.0	+21.3
Labour	Jennie Thomas	153	22.0	+22.0
Majority		388	55.9	
Turnout		694		
Conservative hold		Swing		

Donington, Quadring and Gosberton By-Election 3 May 2018
Party	Candidate	Votes	%	±%
Conservative	Sue Wray	1,021	67.5	+10.0
Independent	Terri Cornwell	185	12.2	+12.2
Liberal Democrats	Neil Oakman	169	11.2	+11.2
Labour	Jennie Thomas	138	9.1	+9.1
Majority		836	55.3	
Turnout		1,513		
Conservative hold		Swing		

=== 2019-2023 ===
Spalding Monks House By-Election 8 December 2022
Party	Candidate	Votes	%	±%
Conservative	Stephen Timewell	375	50.8	+27.2
SH Independents	Sam Chauhan	363	49.2	+49.2
Majority		12	1.6	
Turnout		738		
Conservative gain from Independent		Swing		

=== 2023-2027 ===
Spalding St Paul's By-Election 9 November 2023
Party	Candidate	Votes	%	±%
Conservative	Glynis Scalese (elected by drawing of lots)	155	24.9	
SH Independents	Vanessa Browning	155	24.9	
True Independent	Stephen Timewell	132	21.2	
Labour	Aidan Forman	108	17.3	
Independent	Julian Wheeler	73	11.7	
Majority		0	0.0	
Turnout		623		
Conservative gain from SH Independents		Swing		

Long Sutton By-Election 30 July 2026
Party	Candidate	Votes	%	±%
Reform	Robbie Woods	866	56.3	
Conservative	Naomi Andrews	445	28.9	
Green	James Timpson	227	14.8	
Majority		421	27.4	
Turnout		1,538		
Reform gain from Conservative		Swing		
