= 2019 South Holland District Council election =

2019 UK local government election

← 2015	2 May 2019	2023 →

All 37 council seats up for election 19 seats needed for a majority

	First party	Second party
Party	Conservative	Independent
Last election	28	7
Seats after	24	13
Seat change	▼4	▲6
- Map of the results of the election by ward

The 2019 South Holland District Council election took place on 2 May 2019 to elect members of the South Holland District Council in England. It was held on the same day as other local elections.

== Results summary ==
South Holland District Council Election Result 2019
Party	Seats	Gains	Losses	Net gain/loss	Seats %	Votes %	Votes	+/−
Conservative	24	-	4	-4	64.86	54.67	18,014	-4.98
Independent	13	6	-	+6	35.14	37.65	12,407	+13.05
Green	0	-	-	0	0.00	4.04	1,332	+3.19
UKIP	0	-	2	-2	0.00	2.59	852	-10.88
Labour	0	-	-	0	0.00	0.56	184	-0.12
Liberal Democrats	0	-	-	0	0.00	0.49	163	-0.26

== Council Composition ==
Following the last election in 2015, the composition of the council was:

↓
28	7	2
Conservative	Independent	UKIP

After the election, the composition of the council was:

↓
24	13
Conservative	Independent

== Ward results ==
Ward boundaries

Incumbent councillors are denoted by an asterisk (*)

=== Crowland and Deeping St Nicholas ===
Crowland and Deeping St Nicholas (3 seats)
Party	Candidate	Votes	%	±%
Conservative	Nigel Harry Pepper	867	57.2	
Independent	Bryan Alcock*	758	50.0	
Conservative	James Robert Astill*	616	40.7	
Conservative	Angela Harrison*	598	39.5	
Independent	Paul Silvester Przyszlak	499	32.9	
Turnout			30.64	
Conservative hold		Swing		
Independent hold		Swing		
Conservative hold		Swing		

=== Donington, Quadring and Gosberton ===
Donington, Quadring and Gosberton (3 seats)
Party	Candidate	Votes	%	±%
Independent	Jane Lesley King*	962	59.9	
Independent	Henry John William Bingham	808	50.3	
Independent	Simon Charles Walsh	735	45.7	
Conservative	Trevor John Hyde	507	31.5	
Conservative	Ann Elizabeth Savage	486	30.2	
Turnout			28.47	
Independent hold		Swing		
Independent gain from Conservative		Swing		
Independent gain from Conservative		Swing		

=== Fleet ===
Fleet (1 seat)
Party	Candidate	Votes	%	±%
Conservative	Peter Ephraim Coupland*	379	63.8	+1.8
UKIP	Edward George McNally	215	36.2	N/A
Majority		164	27.6	−2.4
Turnout		594	32.57	+2.57
Conservative hold		Swing		

=== Gedney ===
Gedney (1 seat)
Party	Candidate	Votes	%	±%
Conservative	Jo Reynolds*	Uncontested		
Turnout			N/A	
Conservative hold		Swing		

=== Holbeach Hurn ===
Holbeach Hurn (1 seat)
Party	Candidate	Votes	%	±%
Conservative	Nick Worth	Uncontested		
Turnout			N/A	
Conservative hold		Swing		

=== Holbeach Town ===
Holbeach Town (3 seats)
Party	Candidate	Votes	%	±%
Conservative	Francis Biggadike*	890	58.4	
Conservative	Tracey Ann Carter*	890	58.4	
Independent	Graham Thomas Desmond Rudkin	686	45.0	
Independent	Paul Cayton Foyster*	593	38.9	
Conservative	Gordon Geoffrey Donley	491	32.2	
Turnout			26.06	
Conservative hold		Swing		
Conservative hold		Swing		
Independent gain from UKIP		Swing		

Foyster was previously elected as a UKIP councillor.

=== Long Sutton ===
Long Sutton (3 seats)
Party	Candidate	Votes	%	±%
Independent	Andrew Charles Tennant*	1,039	52.3	
Conservative	Jack Tyrrell*	944	47.6	
Independent	David John Wilkinson	899	45.3	
Conservative	Laura Jean Eldridge*	885	44.6	
Conservative	Richard Henry King	800	40.3	
Turnout			32.81	
Independent hold		Swing		
Conservative hold		Swing		
Independent gain from Conservative		Swing		

=== Moulton, Weston and Cowbit ===
Moulton, Weston and Cowbit (3 seats)
Party	Candidate	Votes	%	±%
Conservative	Anthony Casson*	1,042	65.2	
Conservative	Andrew Robert Woolf*	929	58.2	
Conservative	Rodney Grocock*	709	44.4	
UKIP	Richard Geoffrey Fairman	637	39.9	
Turnout			29.96	
Conservative hold		Swing		
Conservative hold		Swing		
Conservative hold		Swing		

=== Pinchbeck and Surfleet ===
Pinchbeck and Surfleet (3 seats)
Party	Candidate	Votes	%	±%
Conservative	Elizabeth Jane Sneath*	918	57.7	
Conservative	James Edward Avery*	860	54.0	
Conservative	Sally Ann Slade*	834	52.4	
Independent	Terrence Moore	823	51.7	
Turnout			28.94	
Conservative hold		Swing		
Conservative hold		Swing		
Conservative hold		Swing		

=== Spalding Castle ===
Spalding Castle (1 seat)
Party	Candidate	Votes	%	±%
Conservative	Gary John Taylor	289	46.7	−19.1
Green	Alistair Mark Jonathon Crisp	233	37.6	+25.5
Independent	James Anthony Le Sage	97	15.7	−6.4
Majority		56	9.1	−34.6
Turnout			32.71	
Conservative hold		Swing		

=== Spalding Monks House ===
Spalding Monks House (2 seats)
Party	Candidate	Votes	%	±%
Independent	Angela Mary Porter*	889	76.7	
Independent	Anthony Christopher Cronin	438	37.8	
Conservative	Zoe Emma Lane	336	29.0	
Labour	Rodney Joseph Sadd	116	10.0	
Green	Hellen Jenner	80	6.9	
Labour	Janet Barnes	68	5.9	
Green	Lee Geoffrey Crisp	56	4.8	
Turnout			28.55	
Independent hold		Swing		
Independent gain from Conservative		Swing		

=== Spalding St. Johns ===
Spalding St. Johns (2 seats)
Party	Candidate	Votes	%	±%
Independent	Manzur Hasan	507	45.6	
Conservative	Jack Daniel McLean*	435	39.1	
Conservative	Janet Brenda Whitbourn	368	33.1	
Independent	Valery Gemmell	295	26.5	
Green	Morgan Nicholas Crisp	143	12.9	
Green	Rustana Zamara	94	8.5	
Turnout			25.47	
Independent hold		Swing		
Conservative hold		Swing		

=== Spalding St. Marys ===
Spalding St. Marys (2 seats)
Party	Candidate	Votes	%	±%
Conservative	Gary Andrew Porter*	439	50.6	
Conservative	Henry Thomas Drury*	427	49.2	
Independent	Robert Carl West	266	30.6	
Green	Adam Baker	262	30.2	
Green	Jonans Sandijs	144	16.6	
Turnout			23.24	
Conservative hold		Swing		
Conservative hold		Swing		

=== Spalding St. Pauls ===
Spalding St. Pauls (2 seats)
Party	Candidate	Votes	%	±%
Independent	Robert Antony Gibson	398	55.1	
Conservative	Glynis Pearl Scalese	355	49.2	
Conservative	David Ashby*	312	43.2	
Turnout			19.30	
Independent gain from UKIP		Swing		
Conservative hold		Swing		

=== Spalding Wygate ===
Spalding Wygate (2 seats)
Party	Candidate	Votes	%	±%
Conservative	Christine Jane Lawton*	483	43.7	
Conservative	Roger Gambba-Jones*	469	42.4	
Independent	Sheila Mary Bunce	343	31.0	
Green	Heather Julie Irene Violett	237	21.4	
Green	Martin Christopher Blake	219	19.8	
Liberal Democrats	Neil Andrew Oakman	163	14.8	
Turnout			23.94	
Conservative hold		Swing		
Conservative hold		Swing		

=== Sutton Bridge ===
Sutton Bridge (2 seats)
Party	Candidate	Votes	%	±%
Independent	Michael David Booth*	686	67.9	
Independent	Christopher James Thomas Harrison Brewis*	686	67.9	
Conservative	Victoria Hills	280	27.7	
Conservative	Sally Ann Beal	176	17.4	
Turnout			30.10	
Independent hold		Swing		
Independent hold		Swing		

=== The Saints ===
The Saints (1 seat)
Party	Candidate	Votes	%	±%
Conservative	Michael David Seymour*	Uncontested		
Turnout			N/A	
Conservative hold		Swing		

=== Whaplode and Holbeach St Johns ===
Whaplode and Holbeach St Johns (2 seats)
Party	Candidate	Votes	%	±%
Conservative	Allan Charles Beal	Uncontested		
Conservative	Paul Alexander Redgate	Uncontested		
Turnout			N/A	
Conservative hold		Swing		
Conservative hold		Swing		
