= Kevin Shinkwin, Baron Shinkwin =

Politician

The Right Honourable The Lord Shinkwin

Member of the House of Lords
- Lord Temporal
- Life peerage 14 October 2015

Personal details
- Born: Kevin Joseph Maximilian Shinkwin; 7 June 1971 (age 55)
- Party: Conservative

Kevin Joseph Maximilian Shinkwin, Baron Shinkwin (born 7 June 1971) is a British Conservative politician and member of the House of Lords.

== Early life and education ==
Shinkwin was educated at Ratcliffe College where his father was a physics teacher. Ratcliffe is a private Catholic school in Ratcliffe on the Wreake, Leicestershire. He also attended Llanarth Court School which was a public school in Raglan, Gwent for a few years. He studied British politics and legislative studies at the University of Hull, graduating with a Bachelor of Arts (BA) degree in 1993.

== Career ==
He worked for almost 20 years in the voluntary sector, serving in various public affairs roles, including at RNID, Macmillan, Cancer Research UK, and The Royal British Legion, where he led successful campaigns on the Armed Forces Covenant and securing reforms to the coroners service for bereaved Armed Forces families. Immediately prior to entering the Lords, he was Director of Public Affairs and Campaigns for the Wine and Spirit Trade Association, a position he resigned following his appointment to avoid a conflict of interest.

On 21 April 2017 he was appointed a commissioner of the Equality and Human Rights Commission. He resigned from this position in December 2017.

=== Political career ===
He was created a life peer taking the title Baron Shinkwin, of Balham in the London Borough of Wandsworth on 14 October 2015. He was introduced to the House of Lords on 17 November 2015. He sits as a Conservative.

Since becoming a Peer, he has focused on charity governance and disability equality issues. In a debate in March 2017 he described Britain's abortion laws as "a licence to kill for the crime of being disabled".

== Personal life ==
He was born with osteogenesis imperfecta.

Orders of precedence in the United Kingdom
Preceded by The Lord Robathan	Gentlemen; Baron Shinkwin	Followed by The Lord Porter of Spalding
