= 2021 Lincolnshire County Council election =

2021 UK local government election

- 6 May 2021

All 70 seats to Lincolnshire County Council 36 seats needed for a majority
	First party	Second party	Third party
Party	Conservative	Independent	Labour
Last election	58	4	6
Seats won	54	5	4
Seat change	▼4	▲1	▼2
	Fourth party	Fifth party	Sixth party
Party	Liberal Democrats	SH Independents	Lincolnshire Independent
Last election	1	1	1
Seats won	3	3	1
Seat change	▲2	▲2	Steady
- Map showing the results of the 2021 Lincolnshire County Council elections.

- Council composition after the election.
Council control before election
Conservative
Council control after election
Conservative

The 2021 Lincolnshire County Council election was held on 6 May 2021, alongside other local elections.

== Summary ==
=== Election result ===
2021 Lincolnshire County Council election
Party	Candidates	Seats	Gains	Losses	Net gain/loss	Seats %	Votes %	Votes	+/−
Conservative	70	54	4	8	▼4	77.1	55.5	97,417	+2.0
Independent	42	5	4	3	▲1	7.1	11.5	20,209	+4.8
Labour	62	4	1	3	▼2	5.7	17.4	30,528	–1.5
Liberal Democrats	25	3	2	0	▲2	4.3	5.2	9,182	–0.2
SH Independents	5	3	3	0	▲3	4.3	2.8	4,937	N/A
Lincolnshire Independent	9	1	0	0	Steady	1.4	3.1	5,439	–3.2
Green	20	0	0	0	Steady	0.0	2.3	4,030	+0.8
Skegness Urban District Society	7	0	0	0	Steady	0.0	1.5	2,616	N/A
For the People, Not the Party	5	0	0	0	Steady	0.0	0.3	558	N/A
Reform	4	0	0	0	Steady	0.0	0.2	284	N/A
Heritage	1	0	0	0	Steady	0.0	0.1	98	N/A
TUSC	1	0	0	0	Steady	0.0	0.1	96	N/A
Liberal	2	0	0	0	Steady	0.0	<0.1	86	N/A

== Results by district ==
=== Boston ===
Boston district summary
Party	Seats	+/-	Votes	%	+/-
Conservative	5	Steady	6,828	52.6	+8.4
Independent	1	Steady	3,746	28.8	+15.7
Labour	0	Steady	1,710	13.2	–1.9
For the People, Not the Party	0	Steady	558	4.3	N/A
Liberal Democrats	0	Steady	148	1.1	–2.6
Total	6	Steady	12,990		

Division results

Boston Coastal
Party	Candidate	Votes	%	±%
Conservative	Paul Skinner	1,567	56.8	+12.0
Independent	Dale Broughton	919	33.3	N/A
Labour	Carole Monkman	271	9.8	+1.0
Majority				
Conservative hold		Swing		

Boston North
Party	Candidate	Votes	%	±%
Conservative	Anton Dani	853	51.9	+15.9
Labour	Benjamin Cook	315	19.2	+0.5
Independent	Neill Hastie	284	17.3	N/A
Liberal Democrats	Jason Stevenson	87	5.3	−2.5
For the People not the Party	Richard Thornalley	70	4.3	N/A
No Description	Matthew Nicholson	33	2.0	N/A
Majority				
Conservative hold		Swing		

Boston Rural
Party	Candidate	Votes	%	±%
Conservative	Michael Brookes	2,125	77.5	+8.8
Labour	Tony Howard	352	12.8	+1.9
For the People not the Party	Tristan Gilbert	265	9.7	N/A
Majority				
Conservative hold		Swing		

Boston South
Party	Candidate	Votes	%	±%
Independent	Alison Austin	874	40.8	−1.7
Conservative	Tracey Abbott	703	32.8	+1.7
Independent	Peter Watson	263	12.3	N/A
Labour	Alan Bell	168	7.8	+0.3
Independent	Sue Ransome	97	4.5	N/A
For the People not the Party	Mike Gilbert	36	1.7	N/A
Majority				
Independent hold		Swing		

Boston West
Party	Candidate	Votes	%	±%
Conservative	Paula Ashleigh-Morris	752	42.9	+6.2
Independent	Stephen Woodliffe	490	27.9	N/A
Labour	Paul Goodale	312	17.8	−5.3
For the People not the Party	Gavin Lee	98	5.6	N/A
Liberal Democrats	Ralph Pryke	61	3.5	−13.5
No Description	Tiggs Keywood-Wainwright	41	2.3	N/A
Majority				
Conservative hold		Swing		

Skirbeck
Party	Candidate	Votes	%	±%
Conservative	Martin Griggs	828	42.4	+1.9
Independent	Anne Dorrian	652	33.4	N/A
Labour	Jackie Barton	292	14.9	−11.8
For the People not the Party	Chris Moore	89	4.6	N/A
No Description	Harley Cook	54	2.8	N/A
No Description	Christopher Cardwell	24	1.2	N/A
No Description	Licia Pinto	15	0.8	N/A
Majority				
Conservative hold		Swing		

=== East Lindsey ===
East Lindsey district summary
Party	Seats	+/-	Votes	%	+/-
Conservative	12	▲1	21,257	60.2	+5.3
Independent	1	▲1	4,078	11.6	+9.1
Labour	0	▼2	6,821	19.3	–2.6
Skegness Urban District Society	0	Steady	2,616	7.4	N/A
Green	0	Steady	437	1.2	N/A
Heritage	0	Steady	98	0.3	N/A
Total	13	Steady	35,307		

Division results

Alford & Sutton
Party	Candidate	Votes	%	±%
Conservative	Colin Matthews	1,840	69.4	+28.3
Labour	Isaac Bailey	506	19.1	+8.8
Skegness Urban District Society	Jimmy Brookes	306	11.5	N/A
Majority				
Conservative hold		Swing		

Horncastle & the Keals
Party	Candidate	Votes	%	±%
Conservative	William Gray	1,406	50.1	−13.3
Labour	Dominik Hinkins	689	24.5	+4.7
Independent	Bill Aron	678	24.2	N/A
Skegness Urban District Society	Simon Claxton	34	1.2	N/A
Majority				
Conservative hold		Swing		

Ingoldmells Rural
Party	Candidate	Votes	%	±%
Conservative	Colin Davie	1,672	67.1	+3.8
Labour	Janet Shaw	347	13.9	−2.8
Skegness Urban District Society	Danny Brookes	241	9.7	N/A
Skegness Urban District Society	Steve Walmsley	233	9.3	N/A
Majority				
Conservative hold		Swing		

Louth North
Party	Candidate	Votes	%	±%
Conservative	Alex Hall	1,098	42.5	−14.1
Independent	Andrew Leonard	912	35.3	N/A
Labour	David Hall	574	22.2	−21.2
Majority				
Conservative hold		Swing		

Louth South
Party	Candidate	Votes	%	±%
Independent	Sarah Parkin	884	31.4	N/A
Independent	Jill Makinson-Sanders	824	29.3	+1.4
Conservative	Terry Taylor	538	19.1	−7.3
Labour	Ros Jackson	473	16.8	−24.0
Heritage	Rebecca Robb	98	3.5	N/A
Majority				
Independent gain from Labour		Swing		

Louth Wolds
Party	Candidate	Votes	%	±%
Conservative	Hugo Marfleet	2,218	67.8	+6.9
Labour	Phyll Smith	667	20.4	+4.8
Independent	Daniel Simpson	386	11.8	−11.7
Majority				
Conservative hold		Swing		

Mablethorpe
Party	Candidate	Votes	%	±%
Conservative	Noi Sear	1,480	53.8	+20.2
Labour	Graham Cullen	1,269	46.2	+10.8
Majority				
Conservative gain from Labour		Swing		

Saltfleet & the Cotes
Party	Candidate	Votes	%	±%
Conservative	Daniel McNally	1,729	70.2	−9.8
Independent	Terry Aldridge	394	16.0	N/A
Labour	Chris Lyons	341	13.8	−6.2
Majority				
Conservative hold		Swing		

Skegness North
Party	Candidate	Votes	%	±%
Conservative	Carl Macey	1,264	55.7	+8.3
Skegness Urban District Society	Mark Dannatt	639	28.1	N/A
Labour	Mark Anderson	368	16.2	−8.1
Majority				
Conservative hold		Swing		

Skegness South
Party	Candidate	Votes	%	±%
Conservative	Susan Blackburn	1,329	52.8	+6.4
Skegness Urban District Society	Billy Brookes	881	35.0	N/A
Labour	Claire Poole	305	12.1	−5.9
Majority				
Conservative hold		Swing		

Tattershall Castle
Party	Candidate	Votes	%	±%
Conservative	Tom Ashton	2,109	80.6	+11.8
Labour	Jacob Croft	289	11.0	−1.1
Green	Karen Stokes	220	8.4	N/A
Majority				
Conservative hold		Swing		

Wainfleet
Party	Candidate	Votes	%	±%
Conservative	Wendy Bowkett	1,948	68.7	+23.8
Labour	Keziah Wood	390	13.8	+2.7
Skegness Urban District Society	Ady Findley	282	9.9	N/A
Green	Jonathan Finnis	217	7.6	N/A
Majority				
Conservative hold		Swing		

Woodhall Spa & Wragley
Party	Candidate	Votes	%	±%
Conservative	Patricia Bradwell	2,626	81.3	−1.0
Labour	Paul Masterman	603	18.7	+1.0
Majority				
Conservative hold		Swing		

=== Lincoln ===
Lincoln district summary
Party	Seats	+/-	Votes	%	+/-
Conservative	4	Steady	8,251	42.4	+2.8
Labour	4	Steady	8,114	41.7	–2.4
Green	0	Steady	1,565	8.0	+3.7
Liberal Democrats	0	Steady	1,260	6.5	+1.4
Reform UK	0	Steady	126	0.6	N/A
TUSC	0	Steady	96	0.5	N/A
Liberal	0	Steady	36	0.2	N/A
Total	8	Steady	19,448		

Division results

Birchwood
Party	Candidate	Votes	%	±%
Conservative	Eddie Strengiel	1,343	59.0	+9.0
Labour	Liz Lowe	725	31.9	−3.3
Green	John Radford	127	5.6	+3.8
Liberal Democrats	Tony Richardson	81	3.6	0.0
Majority				
Conservative hold		Swing		

Boultham
Party	Candidate	Votes	%	±%
Labour	Kev Clarke	945	48.3	−1.0
Conservative	Henry Osbourne	725	37.1	+2.6
Green	Simon Tooke	184	9.4	+3.6
Liberal Democrats	Charles Parker	101	5.2	+1.2
Majority				
Labour hold		Swing		

Carholme
Party	Candidate	Votes	%	±%
Labour	Rob Parker	1,554	57.8	−3.9
Conservative	Jack Choi	658	24.5	+2.0
Green	Nicola Watson	288	10.7	+4.6
Liberal Democrats	Oliver Craven	106	3.9	−2.0
TUSC	Aston Readings	45	1.7	N/A
Liberal	Charles Shaw	36	1.3	N/A
Majority				
Labour hold		Swing		

Ermine & Cathedral
Party	Candidate	Votes	%	±%
Labour	Karen Lee	1,291	44.5	+3.3
Conservative	Christopher Reid	1,289	44.5	+2.7
Liberal Democrats	Richard Dale	159	5.5	−0.7
Green	Valerie Wilkinson	159	5.5	+1.6
Majority				
Labour gain from Conservative		Swing		

Hartsholme
Party	Candidate	Votes	%	±%
Conservative	Mike Clarke	1,182	50.9	+9.0
Labour	Adelle Ellis	873	37.6	−3.4
Green	Matt Parr	191	8.2	+5.3
Liberal Democrats	James Charters	78	3.4	−1.3
Majority				
Conservative hold		Swing		

Park
Party	Candidate	Votes	%	±%
Labour	Julie Killey	1,010	46.9	−6.7
Conservative	Liam Sperrin	453	21.1	−3.9
Liberal Democrats	Natasha Chapman	364	16.9	+10.1
Green	Sally Horscroft	200	9.3	+2.7
Reform	Donald Penman	74	3.4	N/A
TUSC	Nick Parker	51	2.4	N/A
Majority				
Labour hold		Swing		

St Giles
Party	Candidate	Votes	%	±%
Conservative	Nicola Clarke	946	40.0	+0.5
Labour	Robin Renshaw	927	39.2	−5.4
Liberal Democrats	Caroline Kenyon	260	11.0	+5.7
Green	Fiona McKenna	234	9.9	+4.7
Majority				
Conservative gain from Labour		Swing		

Swallow Beck & Witham
Party	Candidate	Votes	%	±%
Conservative	Hilton Spratt	1,655	59.3	+4.2
Labour	Callum Roper	789	28.3	−2.9
Green	Christopher Padley	182	6.5	+3.2
Liberal Democrats	Sarah Uldall	111	4.0	−0.3
Reform	Deborah Guthrie	52	1.9	N/A
Majority				
Conservative hold		Swing		

=== South Holland ===
South Holland district summary
Party	Seats	+/-	Votes	%	+/-
Conservative	6	▼1	11,481	57.4	–3.1
SH Independents	3	▲3	4,937	24.7	N/A
Independent	0	▼2	2,144	10.7	–4.8
Green	0	Steady	854	4.3	+3.7
Labour	0	Steady	576	2.9	–6.4
Total	9	Steady	19,992		

Division results

Crowland
Party	Candidate	Votes	%	±%
Conservative	Nigel Pepper	2,102	78.1	−3.5
Independent	Richard Fairman	588	21.9	N/A
Majority				
Conservative hold		Swing		

Donington Rural
Party	Candidate	Votes	%	±%
SH Independents	Jane King	1,072	49.5	+15.4
Conservative	Rodney Grocock	956	44.1	−13.9
Green	Martin Colman	138	6.4	N/A
Majority				
SH Independents gain from Conservative		Swing		

Holbeach
Party	Candidate	Votes	%	±%
Conservative	Tracey Carter	1,646	73.4	+9.7
SH Independents	Paul Foyster	400	17.8	−6.9
Labour	James Thomas	196	8.7	−2.7
Majority				
Conservative hold		Swing		

Holbeach Rural
Party	Candidate	Votes	%	±%
Conservative	Peter Coupland	1,910	73.5	+5.5
Green	Christopher Clark	401	15.4	N/A
Independent	Edward McNally	287	11.0	N/A
Majority				
Conservative hold		Swing		

Spalding East
Party	Candidate	Votes	%	±%
SH Independents	Robert Gibson	1,003	50.9	+50.9
Conservative	Eddy Poll	967	49.1	−10.8
Majority		36		
SH Independents gain from Conservative		Swing		

Spalding Elloe
Party	Candidate	Votes	%	±%
Conservative	Elizabeth Sneath	1,284	67.0	+0.8
Independent	Douglas Dickens	254	13.3	+9.1
Green	Heather Violett	206	10.8	+4.7
Labour	Rebecca Longbottom	171	8.9	+1.5
Majority				
Conservative hold		Swing		

Spalding South
Party	Candidate	Votes	%	±%
Conservative	Gary Taylor	995	46.3	−11.9
SH Independents	Manzur Hasan	835	38.9	N/A
Labour	Nicholas Brown	209	9.7	−3.5
Green	Martin Blake	109	5.1	N/A
Majority				
Conservative hold		Swing		

Spalding West
Party	Candidate	Votes	%	±%
SH Independents	Angela Newton	1,627	80.7	+34.7
Conservative	David Denman	390	19.3	−24.4
Majority		1,237		
SH Independents hold		Swing		

The Suttons
Party	Candidate	Votes	%	±%
Conservative	Jack Tyrrell	1,231	54.8	+14.8
Independent	Christopher Brewis	1,015	45.2	−8.8
Majority				
Conservative gain from Independent		Swing		

=== North Kesteven ===
North Kesteven district summary
Party	Seats	+/-	Votes	%	+/-
Conservative	10	Steady	17,653	61.1	+5.6
Lincolnshire Independents	1	Steady	4,589	15.9	–5.9
Labour	0	Steady	4,650	16.1	+3.4
Independent	0	Steady	1,050	3.6	+2.4
Liberal Democrats	0	Steady	710	2.5	–2.8
Green	0	Steady	195	0.7	±0.0
Liberal	0	Steady	50	0.2	N/A
Total	11	Steady	28,897		

Division results

Bassingham & Welbourn
Party	Candidate	Votes	%	±%
Lincolnshire Independent	Marianne Overton	1,828	55.4	−5.0
Conservative	Russell Eckert	1,152	34.9	0.0
Labour	Vonnie Townsend	319	9.7	N/A
Majority				
Lincolnshire Independent hold		Swing		

Eagle & Hykeham West
Party	Candidate	Votes	%	±%
Conservative	Mike Thompson	1,600	63.8	+4.5
Independent	Nikki Dillon	408	16.3	+4.8
Labour	Calum Watt	362	14.4	+3.1
Liberal Democrats	Ian Broadley	138	5.5	−6.0
Majority				
Conservative hold		Swing		

Heckington
Party	Candidate	Votes	%	±%
Conservative	Andrew Key	2,547	81.5	+14.8
Labour	Jennifer Peacock	577	18.5	+7.3
Majority				
Conservative hold		Swing		

Hykeham Forum
Party	Candidate	Votes	%	±%
Conservative	Stephen Roe	1,595	72.6	+15.4
Labour Co-op	Calvin Rodgerson	601	27.4	+2.2
Majority				
Conservative hold		Swing		

Metheringham Rural
Party	Candidate	Votes	%	±%
Conservative	Rob Kendrick	1,534	62.7	+3.8
Lincolnshire Independent	Nick Byatt	573	23.4	+2.0
Labour Co-op	Calvin Bissitt	340	13.9	−0.3
Majority				
Conservative hold		Swing		

Potterhanworth & Coleby
Party	Candidate	Votes	%	±%
Conservative	Ian Carrington	1,508	50.4	+0.8
Lincolnshire Independent	Peter Lundgren	926	31.0	−1.0
Labour	Linda Edwards-Shea	431	14.4	+2.9
Liberal Democrats	Stephen Chapman	126	4.2	−2.5
Majority				
Conservative hold		Swing		

Ruskington
Party	Candidate	Votes	%	±%
Conservative	Richard Wright	2,203	79.7	+19.5
Labour	Linda Lowndes	562	20.3	+11.4
Majority				
Conservative hold		Swing		

Sleaford
Party	Candidate	Votes	%	±%
Conservative	Mark Allan	1,062	45.6	−2.3
Labour	Paul Edwards-Shea	475	20.4	+2.0
Lincolnshire Independent	Robert Oates	402	17.3	+2.0
Independent	Heather Lorimer	190	8.2	N/A
Liberal Democrats	Susan Hislop	105	4.5	+1.5
Independent	Edwin Hunt	58	2.5	N/A
Independent	Robert Greetham	38	1.6	+1.1
Majority				
Conservative hold		Swing		

Sleaford Rural
Party	Candidate	Votes	%	±%
Conservative	Andrew Hagues	1,392	55.4	−7.8
Lincolnshire Independent	David Suiter	382	15.2	−6.2
Independent	Steve Mason	356	14.2	N/A
Labour	Keith White	268	10.7	−4.3
Liberal Democrats	Ian Smith	114	4.5	N/A
Majority				
Conservative hold		Swing		

Waddington & Hykeham East
Party	Candidate	Votes	%	±%
Conservative	Thomas Dyer	1,428	63.9	+1.8
Labour	Sue Parker	393	17.6	−0.5
Lincolnshire Independent	Jacob Lord	273	12.2	N/A
Liberal Democrats	Corinne Byron	141	6.3	N/A
Majority				
Conservative hold		Swing		

Washingborough
Party	Candidate	Votes	%	±%
Conservative	Lindsey Cawrey	1,632	65.5	−2.4
Labour	Gary Hewson	322	12.9	−1.1
Lincolnshire Independent	George Lundgren	205	8.2	N/A
Green	Terry Crawshaw	195	7.8	N/A
Liberal Democrats	Diana Catton	86	3.5	−8.3
Liberal	Jason Blackmore	50	2.0	N/A
Majority				
Conservative hold		Swing		

=== South Kesteven ===
South Kesteven district summary
Party	Seats	+/-	Votes	%	+/-
Conservative	11	▼3	19,753	56.7	–0.9
Independent	3	▲3	7,762	22.3	+10.0
Labour	0	Steady	5,682	16.3	–1.1
Liberal Democrats	0	Steady	894	2.6	–3.2
Green	0	Steady	759	2.2	±0.0
Total	14	Steady	34,850		

Division results

Bourne North & Morton
Party	Candidate	Votes	%	±%
Conservative	Sue Woolley	1,962	77.8	−2.1
Labour	Barry Hare	561	22.2	+2.1
Majority				
Conservative hold		Swing		

Bourne South & Thurlby
Party	Candidate	Votes	%	±%
Conservative	Robert Reid	1,906	70.2	+22.3
Labour	Bob Mumby	811	29.8	+18.1
Majority				
Conservative hold		Swing		

Colsterworth Rural
Party	Candidate	Votes	%	±%
Conservative	Bob Adams	1,984	76.8	+9.8
Labour	Rob Shorrock	600	23.2	+12.5
Majority				
Conservative hold		Swing		

Deepings East
Party	Candidate	Votes	%	±%
Independent	Phil Dilks	1,763	66.0	+27.7
Conservative	Barry Dobson	909	34.0	−11.0
Majority				
Independent gain from Conservative		Swing		

Deepings West & Rural
Party	Candidate	Votes	%	±%
Independent	Ashley Baxter	1,621	56.3	+23.7
Conservative	Andrew Halfhide	1,259	43.7	−1.4
Majority				
Independent gain from Conservative		Swing		

Folkingham Rural
Party	Candidate	Votes	%	±%
Conservative	Martin Hill	1,985	59.1	−5.7
Independent	The Chocolate Man Hansen	897	26.7	+2.5
Labour	Paul Richardson	479	14.3	+3.5
Majority				
Conservative hold		Swing		

Grantham Barrowby
Party	Candidate	Votes	%	±%
Conservative	Mark Whittington	1,527	63.1	+6.1
Labour	Tracey Forman	682	28.2	−7.1
Green	Michael Turner	210	8.7	N/A
Majority				
Conservative hold		Swing		

Grantham East
Party	Candidate	Votes	%	±%
Conservative	Linda Wootten	941	45.4	−6.7
Independent	Ian Selby	544	26.2	N/A
Labour	Stuart Fawcett	381	18.4	−8.8
Independent	Elvis Stooke	157	7.6	N/A
Independent	Stephen Hewerdine	50	2.4	N/A
Majority				
Conservative hold		Swing		

Grantham North
Party	Candidate	Votes	%	±%
Conservative	Ray Wootten	2,130	70.8	−3.3
Labour	Wayne Hasnip	525	17.5	+3.1
Green	Ian Simmons	353	11.7	+6.4
Majority				
Conservative hold		Swing		

Grantham South
Party	Candidate	Votes	%	±%
Conservative	Adam Stokes	984	44.7	+4.9
Labour	Lee Steptoe	712	32.3	−6.8
Green	Anne Gayfer	346	15.7	+10.9
Independent	Bruce Wells	122	5.5	N/A
Independent	Louis Stead	38	1.7	−0.6
Majority				
Conservative hold		Swing		

Grantham West
Party	Candidate	Votes	%	±%
Conservative	Richard Davies	1,153	63.1	+2.4
Labour	Vi King	479	26.2	+9.3
Green	Christopher Morgan	196	10.7	+3.6
Majority				
Conservative hold		Swing		

Hough
Party	Candidate	Votes	%	±%
Conservative	Alexander Maughan	2,074	58.4	+5.3
Independent	Paul Wood	1,084	30.5	−7.3
Labour	Andrew Blackwell	395	11.1	+2.2
Majority				
Conservative hold		Swing		

Stamford East
Party	Candidate	Votes	%	±%
Conservative	Kelham Cooke	1,227	46.9	+2.2
Liberal Democrats	Harrish Bisnauthsing	894	34.2	+12.8
Labour	Chris Burke	493	18.9	+6.7
Majority				
Conservative hold		Swing		

Stamford West
Party	Candidate	Votes	%	±%
Independent	Richard Cleaver	1,339	48.0	N/A
Conservative	Owen Pugh	865	31.0	−34.7
Labour	Jo Winterbourne	276	9.9	−1.2
Independent	Steve Carroll	258	9.3	N/A
Independent	Angela Carter-Begbie	49	1.8	N/A
Majority				
Independent gain from Conservative		Swing		

=== West Lindsey ===
West Lindsey district summary
Party	Seats	+/-	Votes	%	+/-
Conservative	6	▼1	12,194	50.8	–2.8
Liberal Democrats	3	▲2	6,170	25.7	+9.6
Labour	0	Steady	2,975	12.4	–1.5
Independent	0	▼1	1,429	6.0	–1.2
Lincolnshire Independents	0	Steady	850	3.5	+0.4
Green	0	Steady	220	0.9	–0.2
Reform UK	0	Steady	158	0.7	N/A
Total	9	Steady	23,996		

Division results

Bardney & Cherry Willingham
Party	Candidate	Votes	%	±%
Conservative	Ian Fleetwood	1,731	61.7	+8.4
Lincolnshire Independent	Chris Darcel	628	22.4	−3.6
Labour	Sheila Jennings	391	13.9	+2.8
Reform	Ben Jackson	54	1.9	N/A
Majority				
Conservative hold		Swing		

Gainsborough Hill
Party	Candidate	Votes	%	±%
Liberal Democrats	Matt Boles	908	61.2	+21.6
Conservative	Sheila Bibb	316	21.3	−5.4
Labour	Michael Hancock	155	10.5	−14.5
Reform	Pat O'Connor	104	7.0	N/A
Majority				
Liberal Democrats hold		Swing		

Gainsborough Rural South
Party	Candidate	Votes	%	±%
Conservative	Richard Butroid	1,915	66.0	+11.1
Labour	Tom Cox	495	17.1	+6.4
Liberal Democrats	Baptiste Velan	268	9.2	−11.9
Lincolnshire Independent	Quincy Connell	222	7.7	N/A
Majority				
Conservative hold		Swing		

Gainsborough Trent
Party	Candidate	Votes	%	±%
Liberal Democrats	Trevor Young	1,100	58.9	+29.3
Independent	Paul Key	355	19.0	−15.0
Conservative	Laura Ashby	250	13.4	−4.6
Labour	Perry Smith	164	8.8	−3.5
Majority				
Liberal Democrats gain from Independent		Swing		

Market Rasen Wolds
Party	Candidate	Votes	%	±%
Liberal Democrats	Stephen Bunney	1,480	45.7	+25.6
Conservative	Tracey Coulson	1,466	45.2	−4.7
Labour	Colin Saywell	294	9.1	+0.5
Majority				
Liberal Democrats gain from Conservative		Swing		

Nettleham & Saxilby
Party	Candidate	Votes	%	±%
Conservative	Jackie Brockway	2,052	66.5	−1.4
Liberal Democrats	Angela White	478	15.5	−3.9
Labour	Morag Green	336	10.9	+1.1
Green	Benjamin Loryman	220	7.1	N/A
Majority				
Conservative hold		Swing		

North Wolds
Party	Candidate	Votes	%	±%
Conservative	Tom Smith	1,686	59.7	−15.6
Liberal Democrats	Louise Reece	720	25.5	N/A
Labour	Brian Green	419	14.8	−9.9
Majority				
Conservative hold		Swing		

Scotter Rural
Party	Candidate	Votes	%	±%
Conservative	Clio Perraton-Williams	1,054	38.9	−10.8
Liberal Democrats	Lesley Rollings	992	36.6	+5.9
Independent	Paul Howitt-Cowan	390	14.4	N/A
Labour	Robert Adderley	276	10.2	−1.0
Majority				
Conservative hold		Swing		

Welton Rural
Party	Candidate	Votes	%	±%
Conservative	Sue Rawlins	1,724	56.0	−6.4
Independent	Diana Rodgers	684	22.2	+2.6
Labour	David Bond	445	14.5	−3.5
Liberal Democrats	Neil Taylor	224	7.3	N/A
Majority				
Conservative hold		Swing		

== Changes 2021–2025 ==
Alison Austin, elected as an independent in the Boston South division, joined local party the South Holland Independents in the summer of 2023.

=== By-elections ===
==== Carholme ====
Carholme: 14 September 2023
Party	Candidate	Votes	%	±%
Labour	Neil Murray	896	48.0	–9.8
Liberal Democrats	James Brown	680	36.4	+32.5
Conservative	Thomas Hulme	150	8.0	–16.5
TUSC	Nick Parker	74	4.0	+2.3
Reform	Jane Smith	66	3.5	N/A
Majority		216	11.6	
Turnout		1,872	25.3	
Registered electors		7,399		
Labour hold		Swing	▼21.2	

==== Grantham North ====
Grantham North: 9 November 2023
Party	Candidate	Votes	%	±%
Conservative	Paul Martin	762	39.2	–31.6
Independent	Tim Harrison	446	23.0	N/A
Labour	Jonathan Cook	380	19.6	+2.1
Green	Anne Gayfer	193	9.9	–1.8
Liberal Democrats	Nat Sweet	87	4.5	N/A
Independent	Dean Ward	74	3.8	N/A
Majority		316	16.2	
Turnout		1,966	23.7	
Registered electors		8,281		
Conservative hold				

==== Park ====
Park: 2 May 2024
Party	Candidate	Votes	%	±%
Labour	Debbie Armiger	1,054	45.2	−1.7
Liberal Democrats	Martin Christopher	656	28.1	+11.2
Reform	Jane Smith	212	9.1	+5.7
Green	Sally Horscroft	192	8.2	−1.1
Conservative	Charlie Rogers	148	6.3	−14.8
TUSC	Emma Knight	48	2.1	−0.3
Liberal	Charles Shaw	22	0.9	N/A
Majority		398		
Turnout		2,345	26.6	
Registered electors		8,812		
Labour hold		Swing		
