= 2023 South Holland District Council election =

2023 English local election

- 4 May 2023

All 37 seats on South Holland District Council 19 seats needed for a majority

	First party	Second party	Third party
Leader	Gary Porter (defeated)	Rob Gibson
Party	Conservative	SH Independents	Independent
Seats before	23	7	7
Seats after	19	15	3
- Results by ward
Leader before election
Gary Porter
Conservative
Leader after election
Nick Worth
Conservative

The 2023 South Holland District Council election took place on 4 May 2023, to elect all 37 members of South Holland District Council in Lincolnshire, England. This was on the same day as other local elections across England.

== Overview ==
Prior to the election the council was under Conservative majority control. At the previous election in 2019 every elected candidate had been either a Conservative or an independent councillor. In 2021 a group of the independent councillors formed a registered political party, the "South Holland Independents". By the time of the 2023 election seven of the independent councillors had joined the South Holland Independents. They sat on the council as a group with four of the other seven independent councillors as the "South Holland Independents and Independents" group. The other three independent councillors (all of whom had been elected as Conservatives) did not belong to any group.

Following the results, the Conservatives retained overall control, but with a reduced majority. Their leader, Gary Porter, who had been leader of the council since 2003, lost his seat. Nick Worth was appointed the new leader of the council at the subsequent annual council meeting on 17 May 2023. The South Holland Independents won 15 seats and the other three seats were won by other independent councillors. The South Holland Independents and independents formed a single group of 18 councillors after the election called the "Independent Group".

== Results ==
2023 South Holland District Council election
Party	Candidates	Seats	Gains	Losses	Net gain/loss	Seats %	Votes %	Votes	+/−
Conservative	35	19	2	9	▼5	51.4		9,928	
SH Independents	19	15	15	0	▲15	40.5		6,865	
Independent	7	3	0	8	▼10	8.1		3,224	
Green	4	0	0	0	Steady	0		1,221	
Labour	1	0	0	0	Steady	0		401	
Reform	1	0	0	0	Steady	0		212	

== Ward results ==
The results for each ward were as follows, with an asterisk (*) indicating sitting councillors standing for re-election.

=== Crowland and Deeping St Nicholas ===
Crowland and Deeping St Nicholas
Party	Candidate	Votes	%	±%
Conservative	James Robert Astill* (Jim Astill)	770	58.2	+17.5
Independent	Bryan Alcock*	757	57.2	+7.2
Conservative	Angela Harrison (Angie Harrison)	577	43.6	+4.1
Green	Amy Rebecca Cook-Nykyforczuk	489	37.0	N/A
Turnout		1,326	24.55	
Registered electors		5,402		
Conservative hold				
Independent hold				
Conservative hold				

=== Donington, Quadring and Gosberton ===
Donington, Quadring and Gosberton
Party	Candidate	Votes	%	±%
SH Independents	Jane Lesley King*	856	55.7	−4.2
Conservative	Henry John William Bingham*	737	48.0	−2.3
Conservative	Margaret Ann Geaney	631	41.1	+9.6
SH Independents	Simon Charles Walsh*	597	38.9	−6.8
Conservative	Colin Neville Johnson	542	35.3	+5.1
Reform	Matthew James Swainson	212	13.8	N/A
Turnout		1,550	26.48	
Registered electors		5,854		
SH Independents gain from Independent				
Conservative gain from Independent				
Conservative gain from Independent				

Jane King had been elected as an independent in 2019; seat shown here as South Holland Independents gain from independent to allow comparison with 2019 results. Henry Bingham had been elected as an independent in 2019 but joined the Conservatives in 2021; seat shown here as Conservative gain from independent. Margaret Geaney has previously been a councillor for the Bletchley West Ward (Milton Keynes) between 2015 and 2019.

=== Fleet ===
Fleet
Party	Candidate	Votes	%	±%
SH Independents	Paul Stephen Barnes	373	65.6	N/A
Conservative	Edward George McNally	196	34.4	−1.8
Turnout		573	29.75	
Registered electors		1,926		
SH Independents gain from Conservative				

=== Gedney ===
Gedney
Party	Candidate	Votes	%	±%
Conservative	Joanne Louise Reynolds* (Jo Reynolds)	289	60.7	+60.7
SH Independents	Matthew James Stancer	187	39.3	N/A
Turnout		479	26.35	
Registered electors		1,818		
Conservative hold				

=== Holbeach Hurn ===
Holbeach Hurn
Party	Candidate	Votes	%	±%
Conservative	Charles Nicholas Worth* (Nick Worth)	331	73.7	+73.7
Green	Wendy Jane Blackman	118	26.3	N/A
Turnout		453	25.18	
Registered electors		1,799		
Conservative hold				

=== Holbeach Town ===
Holbeach Town
Party	Candidate	Votes	%	±%
Conservative	Tracey Ann Carter*	959	60.3	+1.9
SH Independents	Sophie Elizabeth Hutchinson	734	46.1	N/A
Conservative	Nanette Jacqueline Chapman	557	35.0	−23.4
SH Independents	Paul Cayton Foyster	523	32.9	−6.0
Independent	Graham Thomas Desmond Rudkin*	496	31.2	−13.8
Conservative	Malcolm Godfrey Chandler	484	30.4	−1.8
Independent	Francis Biggadike*	332	20.9	−37.5
Turnout		1,597	25.21	
Registered electors		6,336		
Conservative hold				
SH Independents gain from Independent				
Conservative hold				

Francis Biggadike had been elected in 2019 as a Conservative but left the party early in 2023 after not being selected as the party's candidate for this election.

=== Long Sutton ===
Long Sutton
Party	Candidate	Votes	%	±%
Independent	Andrew Charles Tennant*	982	58.2	+5.9
Conservative	Jack Tyrrell*	967	57.3	+9.7
Independent	David John Wilkinson*	782	46.4	+1.1
Conservative	David Ivan Thompson	624	37.0	−7.6
Turnout		1,691	27.88	
Registered electors		6,066		
Independent hold				
Conservative hold				
Independent hold				

=== Moulton, Weston and Cowbit ===
Moulton, Weston and Cowbit
Party	Candidate	Votes	%	±%
Conservative	Anthony Casson*	1,006	57.7	−7.5
SH Independents	Thomas Edmund Sneath	976	56.0	N/A
Conservative	Andrew Robert Woolf*	958	54.9	−3.3
Conservative	Rodney Grocock*	659	37.8	−6.6
Turnout		1,759	29.95	
Registered electors		5,874		
Conservative hold				
SH Independents gain from Conservative				
Conservative hold				

=== Pinchbeck and Surfleet ===
Pinchbeck and Surfleet
Party	Candidate	Votes	%	±%
Conservative	Elizabeth Jane Sneath*	904	56.7	−1.0
Conservative	James Edward Avery*	886	55.6	+1.6
Conservative	Sally Ann Slade*	780	49.0	−3.4
Independent	Terence Moore (Terry Moore)	699	43.9	−7.8
Green	Simon Richard Jenkins	431	27.1	N/A
Turnout		1,599	27.13	
Registered electors		5,894		
Conservative hold				
Conservative hold				
Conservative hold				

=== Spalding Castle ===
Spalding Castle
Party	Candidate	Votes	%	±%
Conservative	Gary John Taylor*	335	64.7	+18.0
Green	Martin Christopher Blake	183	35.3	−2.3
Turnout		521	28.47	
Registered electors		1,830		
Conservative hold				

=== Spalding Monks House ===
Spalding Monks House
Party	Candidate	Votes	%	±%
SH Independents	Suresh Chauhan (Sam Chauhan)	604	59.4	N/A
SH Independents	Ingrid Helen Sheard	524	51.5	N/A
Conservative	Stephen Peter Timewell*	468	46.0	+17.0
Conservative	Valerie Gemmell (Val Gemmell)	275	27.0	N/A
Turnout		1,022	24.32	
Registered electors		4,203		
SH Independents gain from Conservative				
SH Independents gain from Conservative				

Shown as two gains for South Holland Independents from independents to allow comparison with 2019 results. Stephen Timewell had won his seat for the Conservatives in a by-election in 2022. The other seat was held by Anthony Cronin, who was elected as an independent in 2019 but who subsequently joined the South Holland Independents. He did not stand for re-election.

=== Spalding St John's ===
Spalding St John's
Party	Candidate	Votes	%	±%
SH Independents	Manzur Hasan*	732	71.6	+26.0
SH Independents	James Anthony Le Sage	611	59.7	N/A
Conservative	Edward Oliver Sneath	242	23.7	−16.4
Conservative	Ann Elizabeth Savage	224	21.9	−11.2
Turnout		1,024	23.75	
Registered electors		4,312		
SH Independents gain from Independent				
SH Independents gain from Conservative				

Manzur Hasan had been elected in 2019 as an independent councillor but had subsequently joined the South Holland Independents. The other seat had been held by Jack McLean prior to the election, who had been elected in 2019 as a Conservative but left the party in October 2020 and sat as a non-aligned independent for the remainder of his term. He did not stand for re-election.

=== Spalding St Mary's ===
Spalding St Mary's
Party	Candidate	Votes	%	±%
SH Independents	Mark Edward Le Sage	559	57.4	N/A
SH Independents	David Roy Ashby (Dave Ashby)	472	48.5	N/A
Conservative	William Luke John Hayes	432	44.4	−4.8
Conservative	Gary Andrew Porter*	368	37.8	−12.8
Turnout		978	26.82	
Registered electors		3,647		
SH Independents gain from Conservative				
SH Independents gain from Conservative				

=== Spalding St Paul's ===
Spalding St Paul's
Party	Candidate	Votes	%	±%
SH Independents	Robert Antony Gibson* (Rob Gibson)	458	65.4	+10.3
SH Independents	Bailey Paul John Boulding	385	55.0	N/A
Conservative	Glynis Pearl Scalese*	269	38.4	−10.8
Conservative	Christopher James Sutton	197	28.1	−15.1
Turnout		707	19.42	
Registered electors		3,641		
SH Independents gain from Independent				
SH Independents gain from Conservative				

Rob Gibson had been elected in 2019 as an independent but had subsequently been one of the founder members of the South Holland Independents, of which he was the leader.

=== Spalding Wygate ===
Spalding Wygate
Party	Candidate	Votes	%	±%
Conservative	Janet Brenda Whitbourn (Jan Whitbourn)	473	45.5	+1.8
SH Independents	Aaron Jacob Spencer	423	40.7	N/A
Conservative	Roger Gambba-Jones*	411	39.6	−2.8
Labour	Aidan James Forman	401	38.6	N/A
Turnout		1,040	21.83	
Registered electors		4,763		
Conservative hold				
SH Independents gain from Conservative				

=== Sutton Bridge ===
Sutton Bridge
Party	Candidate	Votes	%	±%
SH Independents	Michael David Booth*	540	58.7	−9.2
SH Independents	Christopher James Thomas Harrison Brewis*	493	53.6	−14.3
Conservative	Peter Ephraim Coupland**	381	41.4	+13.7
Conservative	Laurence Philip Marchant	348	37.8	+20.4
Turnout		948	27.7	
Registered electors		3,423		
SH Independents gain from Independent				
SH Independents gain from Independent				

Peter Coupland had been the councillor for Fleet ward immediately before the election. Michael Booth and Christopher Brewis had both been elected in 2019 as independents but subsequently joined the South Holland Independents.

=== The Saints ===
The Saints
Party	Candidate	Votes	%	±%
Conservative	Laura Jean Eldridge	524	76.8	+76.8
Independent	Michael David Seymour*	158	23.2	+23.2
Turnout		686	32.36	
Registered electors		2,120		
Conservative hold				

Michael Seymour had been elected as a Conservative in 2019 but left the party early in 2023 after not being selected as the party's candidate for this election.

=== Whaplode and Holbeach St John's ===
Whaplode and Holbeach St John's
Party	Candidate	Votes	%	±%
Conservative	Allan Charles Beal*	615	60.5	+60.5
Conservative	Paul Alexander Redgate*	555	54.6	+54.6
SH Independents	Harry Joshua Griffen	423	41.6	N/A
Turnout		1,024	28.58	
Registered electors		3,583		
Conservative hold				
Conservative hold				

== Changes 2023–2027 ==
=== Spalding St Paul's ===
Spalding St Paul's by election, 9 November 2023
Party	Candidate	Votes	%	±%
Conservative	Glynis Pearl Scalese	155	24.9	−13.5
SH Independents	Vanessa Browning	155	24.9	−30.1
Independent	Stephen Peter Timewell	132	21.2	N/A
Labour	Aidan James Forman	108	17.3	N/A
Independent	Julian Ashley Wheeler	73	11.7	N/A
Turnout		623	17.53	
Registered electors		3,582		
Conservative gain from SH Independents				

This by-election was triggered by the resignation of South Holland Independents councillor Bailey Boulding. The result of the by-election was a tie which was resolved by drawing lots.

Sally-Ann Slade, who was elected as a Conservative, left the party in March 2025 to sit as an independent councillor.

=== Long Sutton ===
Long Sutton by-election, 30th July 2026
Party	Candidate	Votes	%	±%
Reform	Robbie Woods	866	56.3	N/A
Conservative	Naomi Andrews	445	28.9	−20.7
Green	James Timpson	227	14.8	N/A
Majority		421	27.4	N/A
Turnout		1538	25.4	−2.5
Registered electors		6,066		
Reform gain from Independent		Swing		
