= 2015 South Holland District Council election =

2015 UK local government election

Results of the 2015 South Holland District Council election

The 2015 South Holland District Council election took place on 7 May 2015 to elect members of the South Holland District Council in England. It was held on the same day as other local elections.

== Results summary ==
South Holland District Council Election Result 2015
Party	Seats	Gains	Losses	Net gain/loss	Seats %	Votes %	Votes	+/−
Conservative	28	4	1	+3	75.68	59.65	42,672	+4.15
Independent	7	1	5	-4	18.92	24.60	17,596	-12.63
UKIP	2	2	0	+2	5.40	13.47	9,632	+12.39
Green	0	-	-	0	0.00	0.85	608	+0.56
Liberal Democrats	0	-	-	0	0.00	0.75	538	-1.00
Labour	0	-	-	0	0.00	0.68	486	-0.18
Lincolnshire Independent	0	-	1	-1	0.00	0.00	0	-1.80

== Council composition ==
Following the last election in 2011, the composition of the council was:

↓
25	11	1
Conservative	Independent	LI

After the election, the composition of the council was:

↓
28	7	2
Conservative	Independent	UKIP

LI - Lincolnshire Independents

== Ward results ==
=== Crowland and Deeping St Nicholas ===
Crowland and Deeping St Nicholas (3 seats)
Party	Candidate	Votes	%	±%
Conservative	James Astill	1,396	36.7	
Conservative	Angela Harrison	1,201		
Independent	Bryan Alcock*	1,017	26.8	
Conservative	Jennifer Head	968		
UKIP	Peter Bird	903	23.8	
Independent	Paul Barrett	635		
Green	Brian Sumner	483	12.7	
Conservative hold		Swing		
Conservative hold		Swing		
Independent hold		Swing		

=== Donington, Quadring and Gosberton ===
Donington, Quadring and Gosberton (3 seats)
Party	Candidate	Votes	%	±%
Conservative	Robert Clark*	2,268	57.5	
Independent	Jane King*	1,677	42.5	
Conservative	Colin Johnson	1,657		
Conservative	Roger Neal	1,043	1,043	
Conservative hold		Swing		
Independent hold		Swing		
Conservative hold		Swing		

=== Fleet ===
Fleet (1 seat)
Party	Candidate	Votes	%	±%
Conservative	Peter Coupland	720	62.0	
Independent	Paul Chapman	371	32.0	
Liberal Democrats	Anne Ramkaran	70	6.0	
Majority		349	30.0	+12.2
Conservative hold		Swing		

=== Gedney ===
Gedney (1 seat)
Party	Candidate	Votes	%	±%
Conservative	Joanne Reynolds	588	47.5	−0.7
UKIP	Andrew Parks	406	32.8	
Independent	Sarah Wilkinson*	245	19.8	−32.0
Majority		182	14.7	
Conservative gain from Independent		Swing		

=== Holbeach Hurn ===
Holbeach Hurn (1 seat)
Party	Candidate	Votes	%	±%
Conservative	Charles Worth	719	68.9	
Independent	Richard Crowley	324	31.1	
Majority		395	37.8	
Conservative hold		Swing		

=== Holbeach Town ===
Holbeach Town (3 seats)
Party	Candidate	Votes	%	±%
Conservative	Francis Biggadike*	1,902	46.3	
Conservative	Tracey Carter	1,304		
UKIP	Paul Foyster	1,290	31.4	
Conservative	Rita Rudkin*	1,215		
Independent	Martin Howard	918	22.3	
Conservative hold		Swing		
UKIP gain from Independent		Swing		
Conservative hold		Swing		

=== Long Sutton ===
Long Sutton (3 seats)
Party	Candidate	Votes	%	±%
Conservative	Jack Tyrrell	2,076	56.2	
Conservative	Laura Eldridge	1,922		
Independent	Andy Tennant*	1,620	43.8	
Independent	David Wilkinson*	1,567		
Independent	Jeanne Sibley	1,039		
Conservative gain from Independent		Swing		
Conservative gain from Independent		Swing		
Independent hold		Swing		

=== Moulton, Weston and Cowbit ===
Moulton, Weston and Cowbit (3 seats)
Party	Candidate	Votes	%	±%
Conservative	Anthony Casson*	1,953	39.4	
Conservative	Andrew Woolf*	1,650		
Conservative	Rodney Grocock*	1,326		
UKIP	Emily Bates	1,198	24.2	
Independent	James Scarsbrook	847	17.1	
Labour	Wojciech Kowalewski	486	9.8	
Liberal Democrats	Mary Lane	468	9.5	
Conservative hold		Swing		
Conservative hold		Swing		
Conservative hold		Swing		

=== Pinchbeck and Surfleet ===
Pinchbeck and Surfleet (3 seat)
Party	Candidate	Votes	%	±%
Conservative	Elizabeth Sneath*	2,074	54.3	
Conservative	James Avery*	1,952		
Conservative	Sally-Ann Slade*	1,908		
UKIP	Geoffrey Garner	1,161	30.4	
Independent	David Turp	583	15.3	
Independent	Douglas Dickens	378		
Conservative hold		Swing		
Conservative hold		Swing		
Conservative hold		Swing		

=== Spalding Castle ===
Spalding Castle (1 seat)
Party	Candidate	Votes	%	±%
Conservative	Gary Taylor*	681	65.8	+1.8
Independent	Mark le Sage	229	22.1	
Green	Martin Blake	125	12.1	−5.8
Majority		451	43.7	−2.2
Conservative hold		Swing		

=== Spalding Monks House ===
Spalding Monks House (2 seats)
Party	Candidate	Votes	%	±%
Independent	Angela Newton*	1,398	43.1	−3.4
Conservative	George Aley	1,026	31.7	−2.2
UKIP	Dave Maltby	817	25.2	
Independent hold		Swing		
Conservative hold		Swing		

=== Spalding St. Johns ===
Spalding St. Johns (2 seats)
Party	Candidate	Votes	%	±%
Conservative	Jack McLean	1,017	39.6	
Independent	Graham Dark*	821	31.9	
UKIP	Robert Gibson	733	28.5	
Independent	Roger Perkins*	421		
Conservative gain from Independent		Swing		
Independent hold		Swing		

=== Spalding St. Marys ===
Spalding St. Marys (2 seats)
Party	Candidate	Votes	%	±%
Conservative	Harry Drury	1,178	47.0	
Conservative	Gary Porter*	1,084		
UKIP	Richard Fairman	805	32.1	
Independent	Robert West	523	20.9	
Conservative hold		Swing		
Conservative hold		Swing		

=== Spalding St. Pauls ===
Spalding St. Pauls (2 seats)
Party	Candidate	Votes	%	±%
Conservative	David Ashby*	889	50.7	
UKIP	Peter Williams	865	49.3	
Conservative	Glynis Scalese	767		
Conservative hold		Swing		
UKIP gain from Conservative		Swing		

=== Spalding Wygate ===
Spalding Wygate (2 seats)
Party	Candidate	Votes	%	±%
Conservative	Roger Gambba-Jones*	1,355	64.0	
Conservative	Christine Lawton*	1,267		
Independent	Anthony Cronin	763	36.0	
Independent	Geraldine Scholes	626		
Conservative hold		Swing		
Conservative hold		Swing		

=== Sutton Bridge ===
Sutton Bridge (2 seats)
Party	Candidate	Votes	%	±%
Independent	Christopher Brewis*	839	45.0	
Independent	Michael Booth*	755		
Conservative	Shirley Giles	539	28.9	
Conservative	Victoria Hills	525		
UKIP	John Scarlett	485	26.0	
Independent hold		Swing		
Independent hold		Swing		

Brewis was previously elected as a Lincolnshire Independent.

=== The Saints ===
The Saints (1 seat)
Party	Candidate	Votes	%	±%
Conservative	Michael Seymour*	839	67.0	
Independent	Valerie Gemmell	413	33.0	
Conservative hold		Swing		

=== Whaplode and Holbeach St. Johns ===
Whaplode and Holbeach St. Johns (2 seats)
Party	Candidate	Votes	%	±%
Conservative	Michael Pullen	1,270	56.7	
Conservative	Malcolm Chandler*	1,232		
UKIP	Karl Richardson	969	43.3	
Conservative hold		Swing		
Conservative hold		Swing		
