= South Holland Independents =

- Leader: Paul Barnes
- Founded: 17 March 2021; 5 years ago
- Headquarters: Spalding, Lincolnshire
- Ideology: Localism
- Colours: Light Blue
- Slogan: "People Before Politics"
- Lincolnshire County Council: 0 / 70
- South Holland District Council: 8 / 37

Website
- shindependents.com

The South Holland Independents is a British political party based in South Holland District in the county of Lincolnshire, England. The group was formed in 2021 by several independent councillors on South Holland District Council.

== History ==
In the 2021 Lincolnshire County Council election, the party elected 3 councillors.

In the 2023 South Holland District Council election, the party elected 15 councillors, leaving the Conservative administration with a majority of 1. They also managed to unseat the council's leader, Gary Porter.

In November 2023, the party lost a seat to the Conservatives: the result of the vote count had been a tie, so it was decided by drawing lots.

The party supported one of their councillors, Mark Le Sage, as an independent candidate in the South Holland and The Deepings constituency in the 2024 general election. He came fourth with 11% of the vote.

In March 2025, five district councillors, including the party's former leader Robert Gibson, left the South Holland Independents to join Reform UK. Three of them also represented the party on the county council, so it was reduced to one seat there. The group of defectors announced their intention to contest the upcoming county council election. One other councillor left; they are now waiting to be ratified by a new party. As a result of these changes of allegiance, Paul Barnes became the party's new leader.

== Principles ==
The group seeks to prioritise the needs of local people over national politics. The issues they focus on include tougher action on anti-social behaviour, tackling fly tipping, improving leisure facilities, and expanding green waste collection.
