= Gary Porter, Baron Porter of Spalding =

British Conservative politician (born 1960)

The Right Honourable The Lord Porter of Spalding CBE
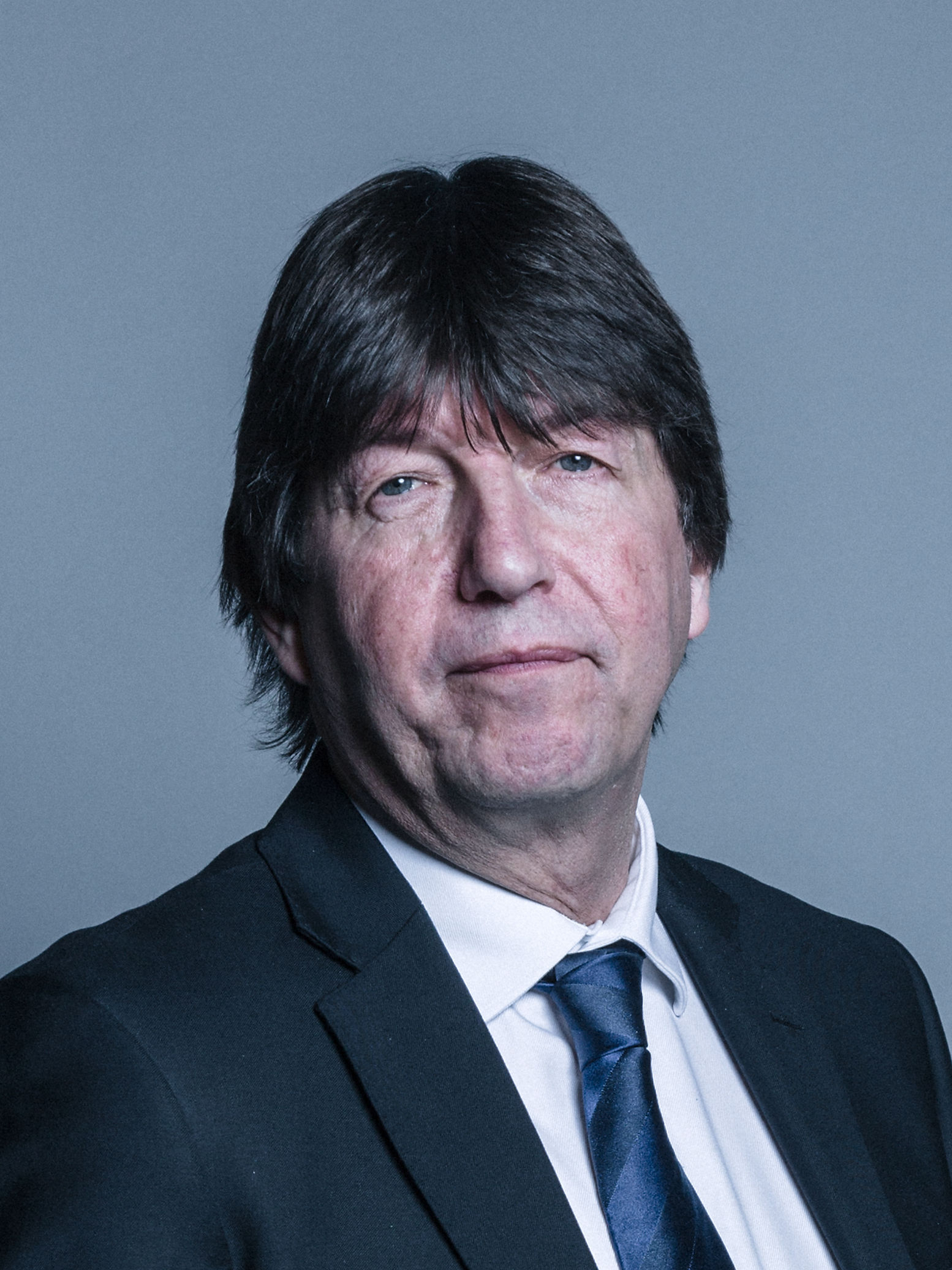
- Porter in 2018

Member of the House of Lords
- Lord Temporal
- Life peerage 15 October 2015

Personal details
- Born: 8 September 1960 (age 66)
- Party: Conservative
- Education: De Montfort University (BA, 2000); Canterbury Christ Church University (Postgraduate Certificate, 2011)

Gary Andrew Porter, Baron Porter of Spalding CBE (born 8 September 1960) is a British Conservative politician, local government leader, member of the House of Lords and former South Holland (Lincolnshire) district councillor, who was elected unopposed as Chair of the Local Government Association in June 2015. He has been the leader of South Holland District Council since 2003 until 2023. Nominated for a life peerage in August 2015, he was created Baron Porter of Spalding, of Spalding in the County of Lincolnshire on 15 October 2015.

He was educated at De Montfort University (BA, 2000) and Canterbury Christ Church University (Postgraduate Certificate, 2011).

Orders of precedence in the United Kingdom
Preceded by The Lord Sinkwin	Gentlemen; Baron Porter of Spalding	Followed by The Lord Willetts
