= South Holland District =

Coordinates: 52.75°N 0.15°W

- Non-metropolitan district
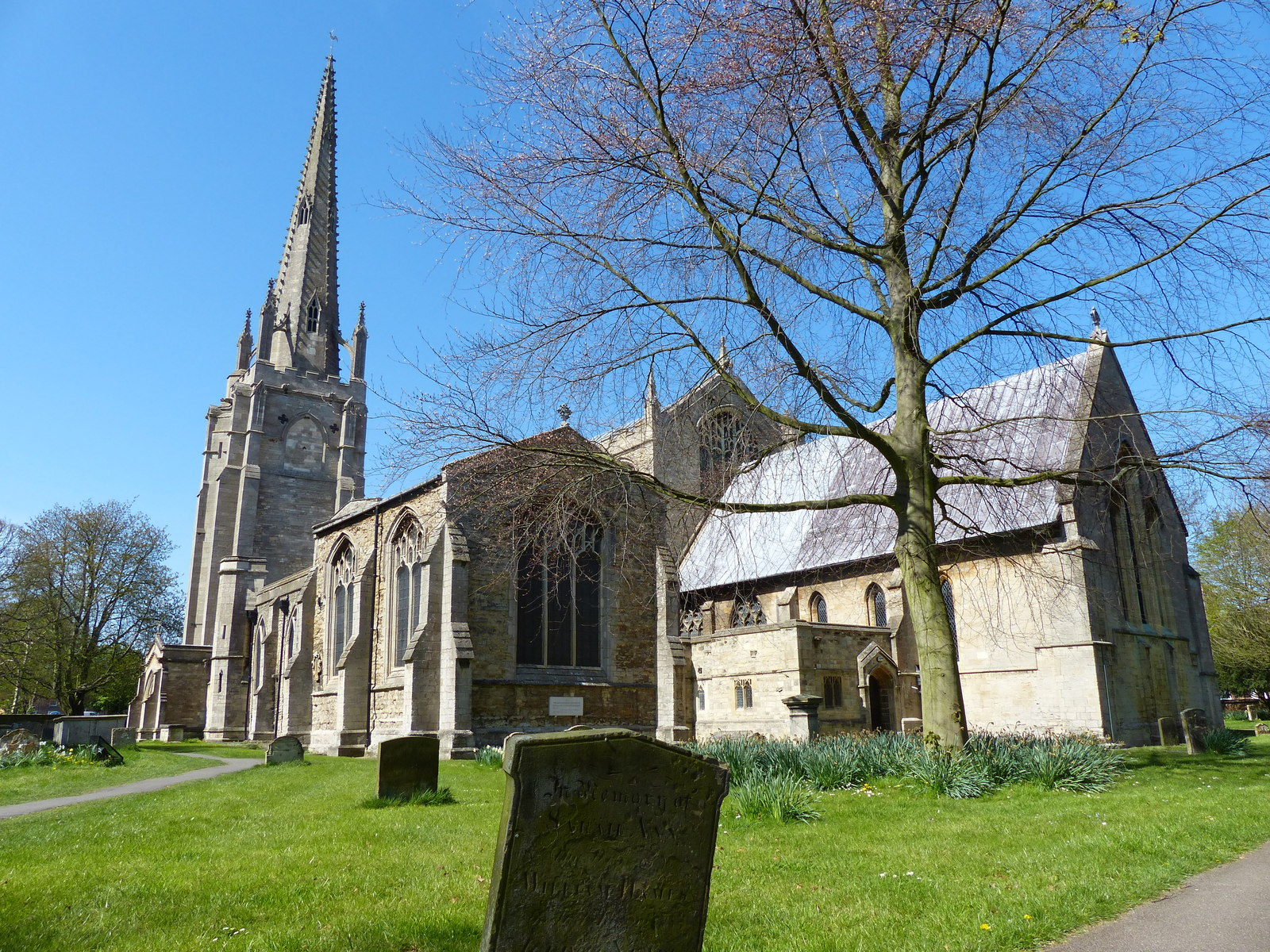
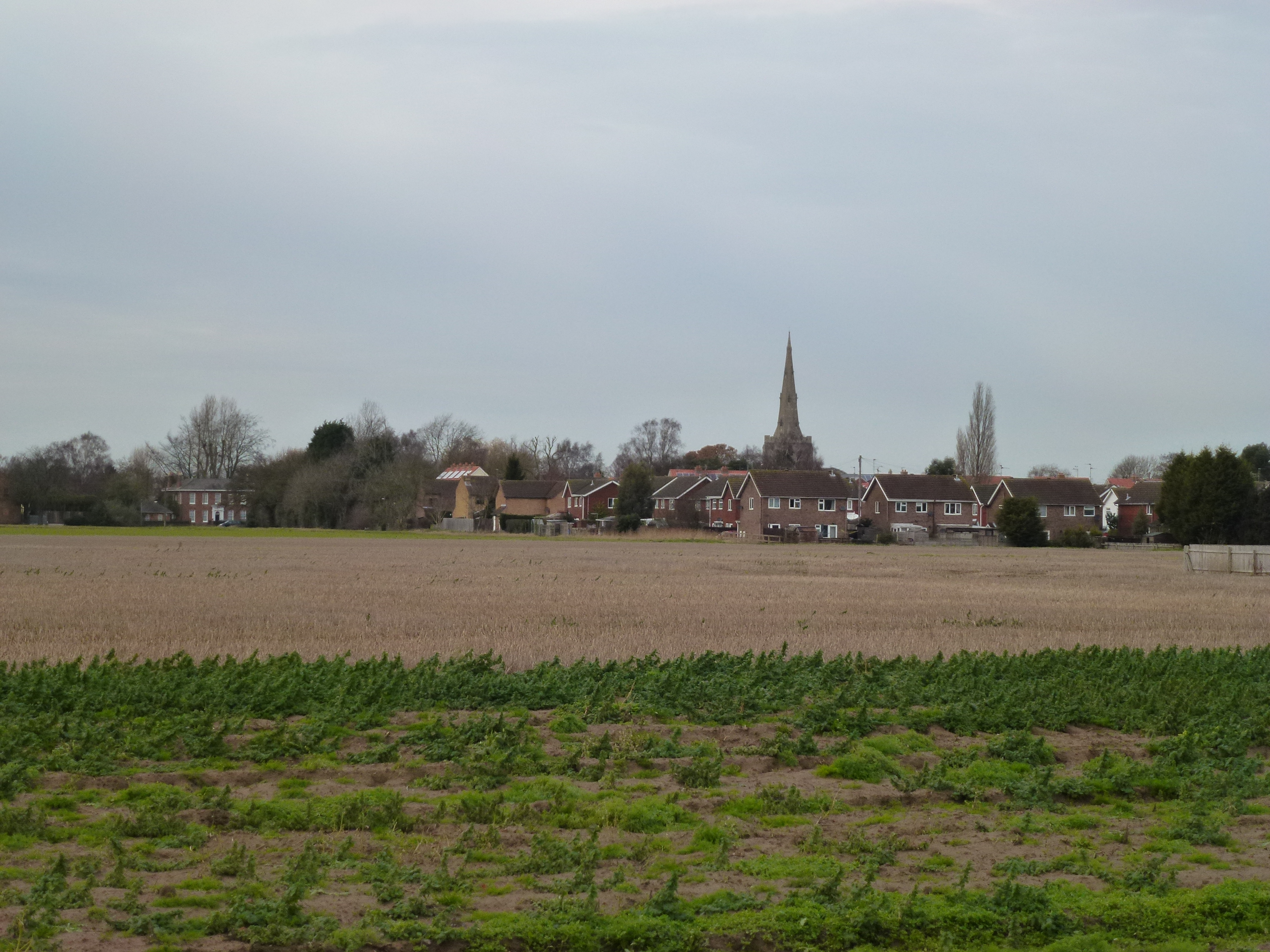
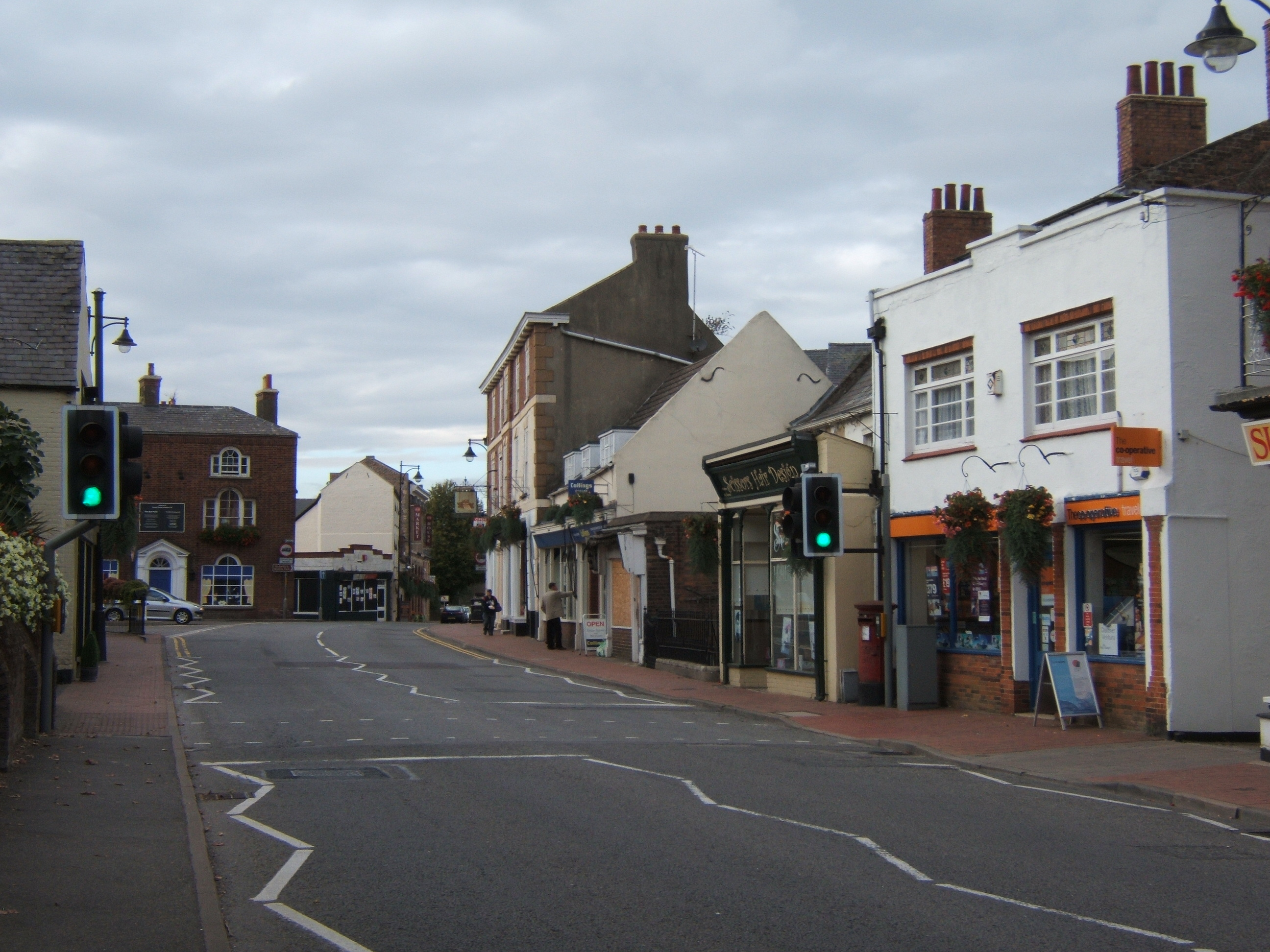
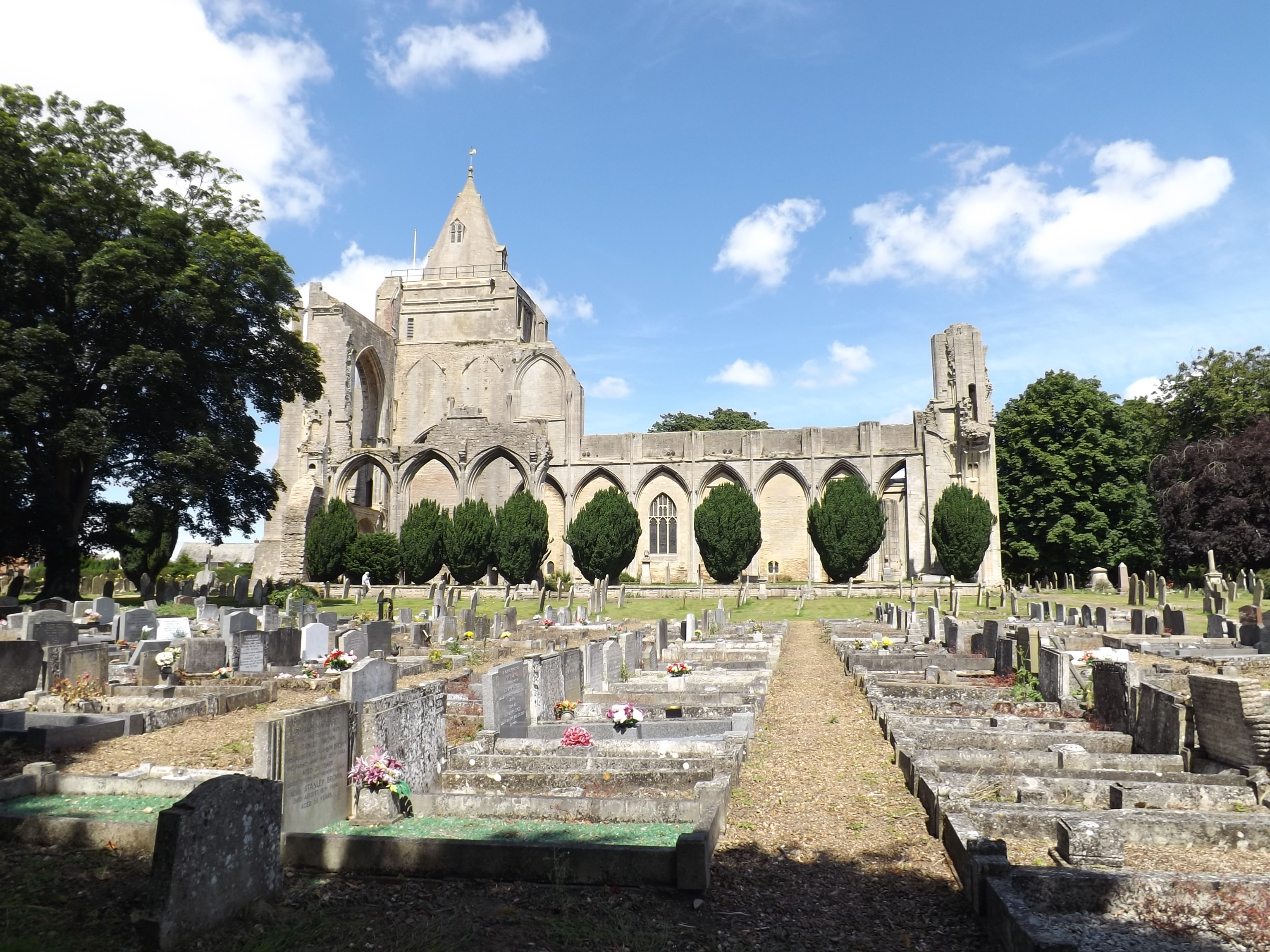
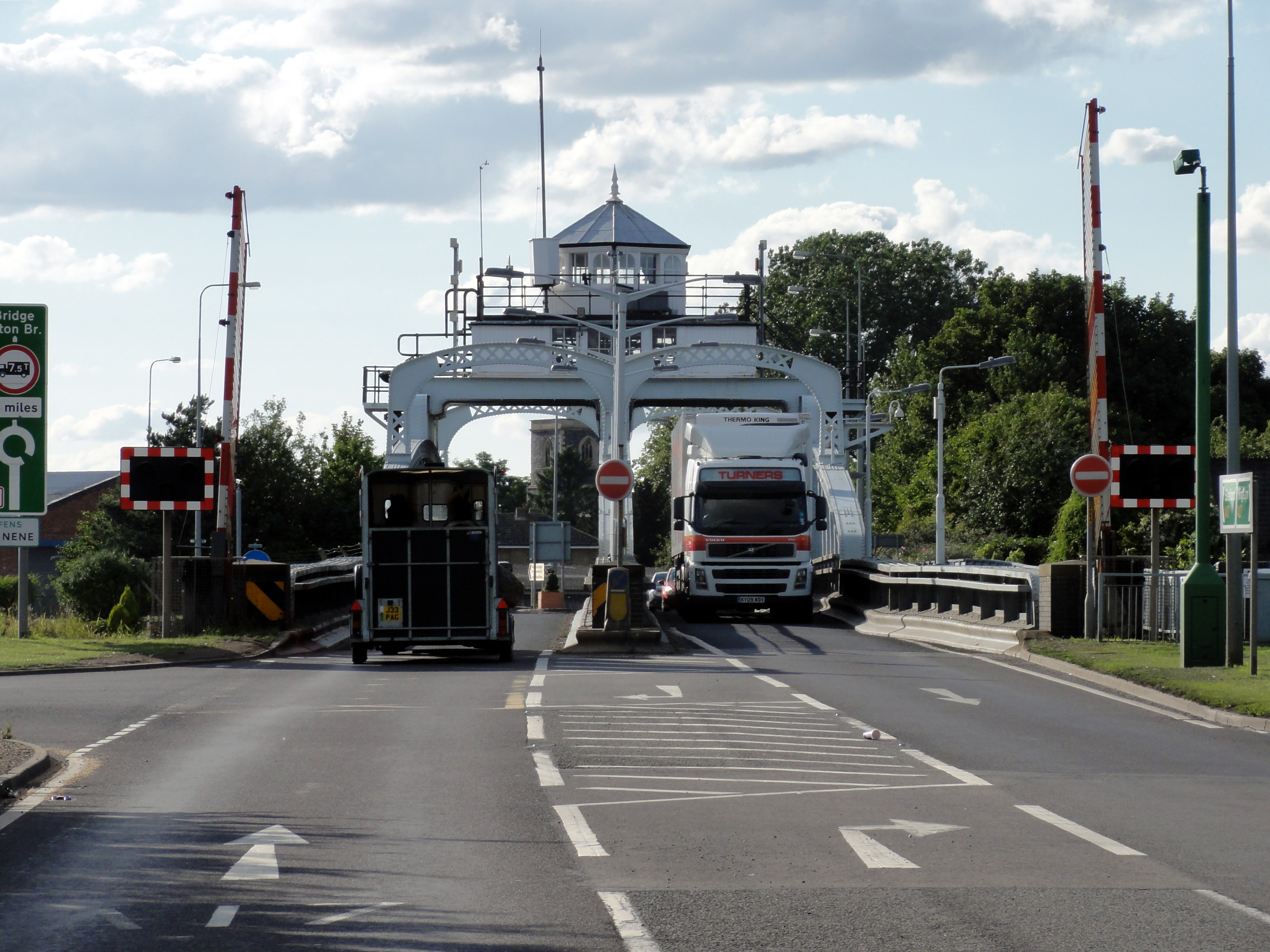
- From left to right; Top: Spalding parish church; Middle: Holbeach skyline and Long Sutton town centre; Bottom: Crowland Abbey and Sutton Bridge's Cross Keys Bridge connecting Lincolnshire to Norfolk via the Wash

- Shown within the ceremonial county of Lincolnshire
- Sovereign state: United Kingdom
- Constituent country: England
- Region: East Midlands
- Administrative county: Lincolnshire
- Founded: 1 April 1974
- Admin. HQ: Spalding

Government
  - Type: South Holland District Council
  - Leadership: Leader & Cabinet
  - Executive: Conservative
  - MP: John Hayes

Area
  - Total: 290 sq mi (750 km^{2})
  - Rank: 44th

Population (2024)
  - Total: 99,298
  - Rank: Ranked 250th
  - Density: 340/sq mi (130/km^{2})

Ethnicity (2021)
  - Ethnic groups: List: 96.3% White; 1.3% Mixed; 1.2% Asian; 0.6% other; 0.5% Black

Religion (2021)
  - Religion: List: 63% Christianity; 35.4% no religion; 0.5% Islam; 0.2% Buddhism; 0.5% other
- Time zone: UTC+0 (Greenwich Mean Time)
  - Summer (DST): UTC+1 (British Summer Time)
- ONS code: 32UF (ONS); E07000140 (GSS)

South Holland is a local government district of Lincolnshire, England. The council is based in Spalding. Other notable towns and villages include Crowland, Sutton Bridge, Donington, Holbeach and Long Sutton. The district is named after the historical division of Lincolnshire known as the Parts of Holland.

The neighbouring districts are Boston, North Kesteven, South Kesteven, Peterborough, Fenland and King's Lynn and West Norfolk.

== History ==
The district was formed on 1 April 1974 under the Local Government Act 1972. It covered the area of three former districts from the administrative county of Holland, which were all abolished at the same time:

- East Elloe Rural District
- Spalding Rural District
- Spalding Urban District

The new district was named South Holland referencing its position within Holland, one of the three historic parts of Lincolnshire.

In 2021 the district council joined East Lindsey District Council and Boston Borough Council in the "South and East Lincolnshire Councils Partnership" which shares management and other staff.

Under current local government reorganisation plans, all district councils in Lincolnshire, as well as the county council, will be abolished in 2028, with the district being combined with others and forming part of a Lincolnshire unitary authority.

== Governance ==
South Holland District Council

Type
- Type: Non-metropolitan district

Leadership
- Chair: Jan Whitbourn, Conservative since 14 May 2025
- Leader: Nick Worth, Conservative since 17 May 2023
- Chief Executive: Rob Barlow since October 2021

Structure
- Seats: 37 councillors
- Graph of the party split among 37 seats.
- Political groups: Administration (18) Conservative (18) Other parties (19) Reform (6) South Holland Ind. (12) Independent (1)

Elections
- Last election: 4 May 2023

Meeting place
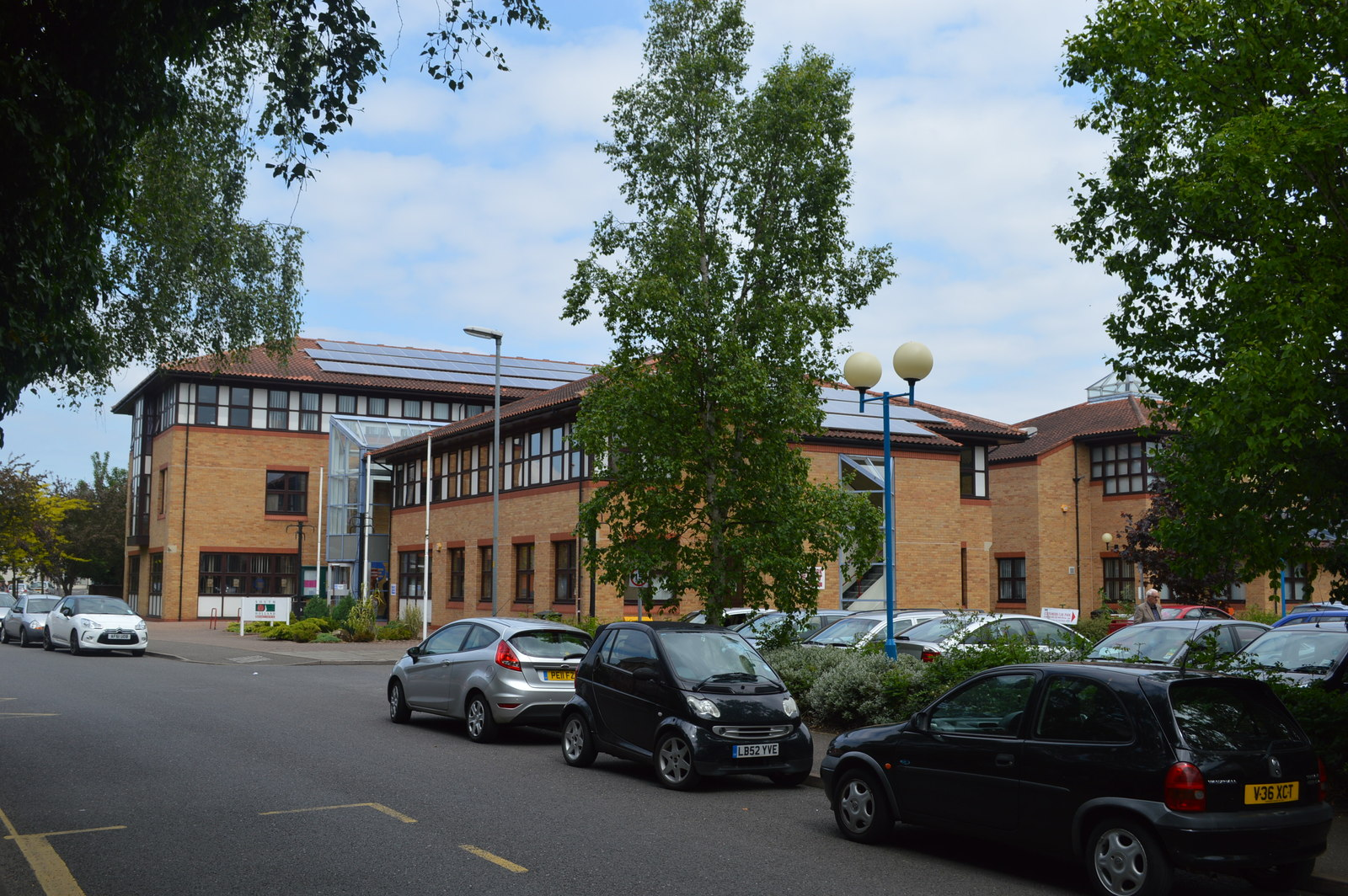
- Council Offices, Priory Road, Spalding, PE11 2XE

Website
- www.sholland.gov.uk

South Holland District Council provides district-level services. County-level services are provided by Lincolnshire County Council. Much of the district is also covered by civil parishes, which form a third tier of local government. The town of Spalding is an unparished area.

=== Political control ===
The council went under no overall control in December 2025 following a change of allegiance. Since then, the Conservatives have run the council as a minority administration.

The first election to the council was held in 1973, initially operating as a shadow authority alongside the outgoing authorities until the new arrangements came into effect on 1 April 1974. Political control of the council since 1974 has been as follows:

| Party in control | Years |
|---|---|
| Independent | 1974–1987 |
| No overall control | 1987–1991 |
| Independent | 1991–1997 |
| No overall control | 1997–1999 |
| Conservative | 1999–2002 |
| No overall control | 2002–2003 |
| Conservative | 2003–2025 |
| No overall control | 2025–present |

=== Leadership ===
The leaders of the council since 1999 have been:

| Councillor | Party | From | To |
|---|---|---|---|
| Eddy Poll | Conservative | 1999 | 2003 |
| Gary Porter | Conservative | 2003 | May 2023 |
| Nick Worth | Conservative | 17 May 2023 | |

=== Composition ===
Following the 2023 election, and subsequent by-elections and changes of allegiance up to July 2026, the composition of the council was:

| Party | Seats |
|---|---|
| Conservative | 18 |
| Reform | 6 |
| South Holland Independents | 12 |
| Independent | 1 |
| Total | 37 |

=== Premises ===
The council is based at the Council Offices on Priory Road in Spalding. The original building had been completed in 1954 for the Spalding Rural District Council, one of the modern council's predecessors. A large extension was added in front of the original building in 1991.

=== Elections ===
Since the last boundary changes in 2007 the council has comprised 37 councillors representing 18 wards, with each ward electing one, two or three councillors. Elections are held every four years.

Landmarks of South Holland
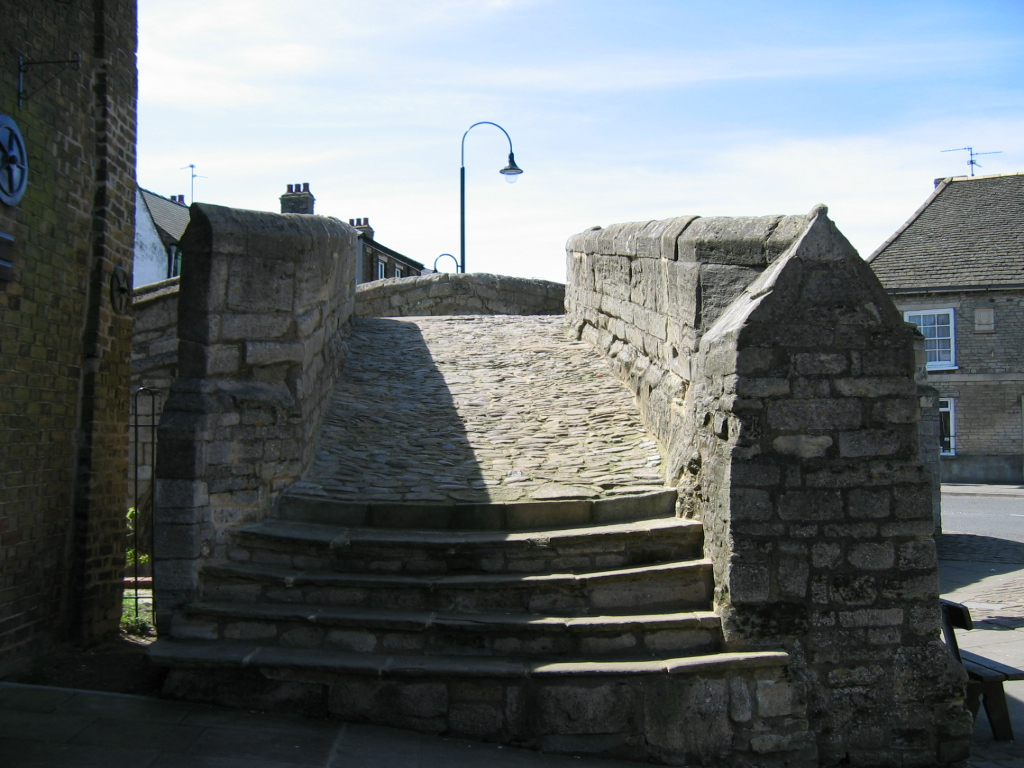
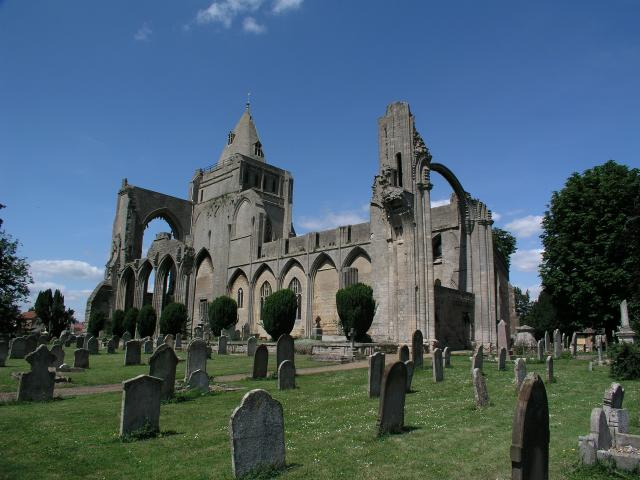
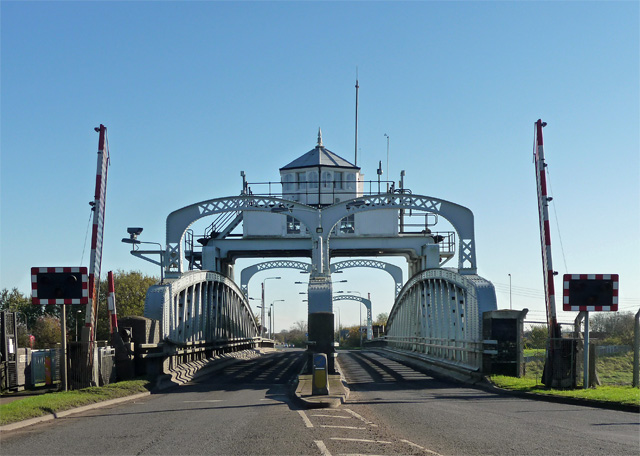
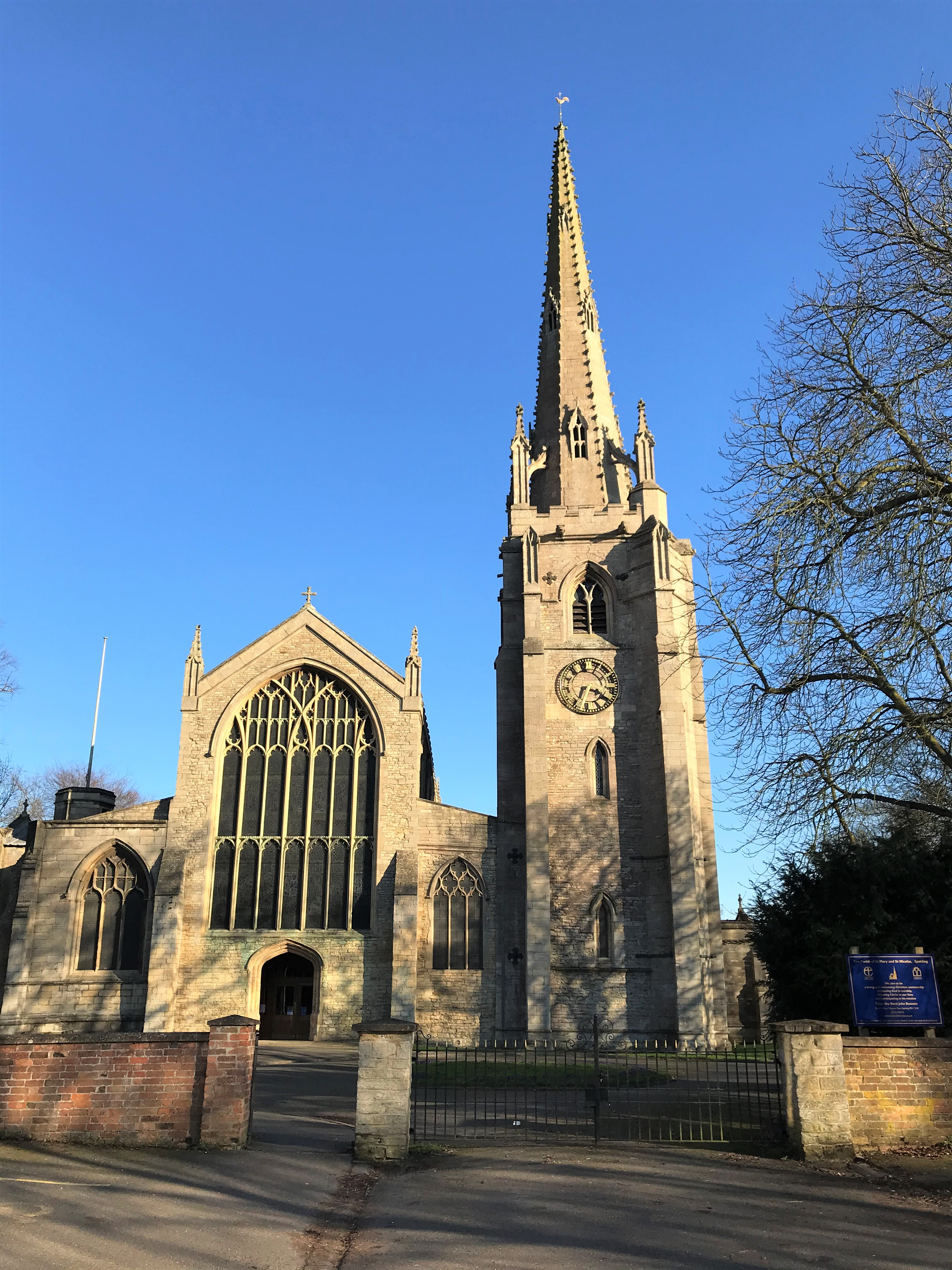
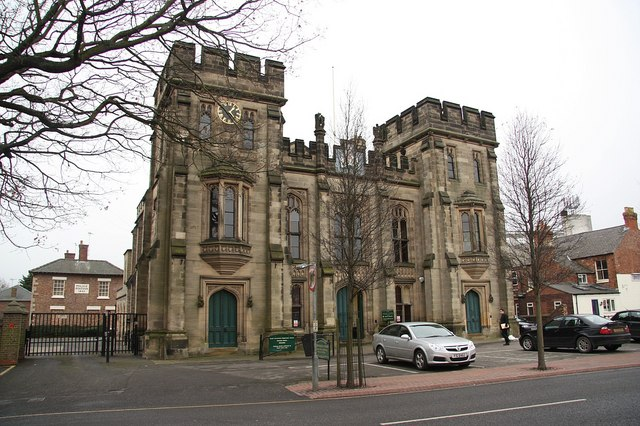
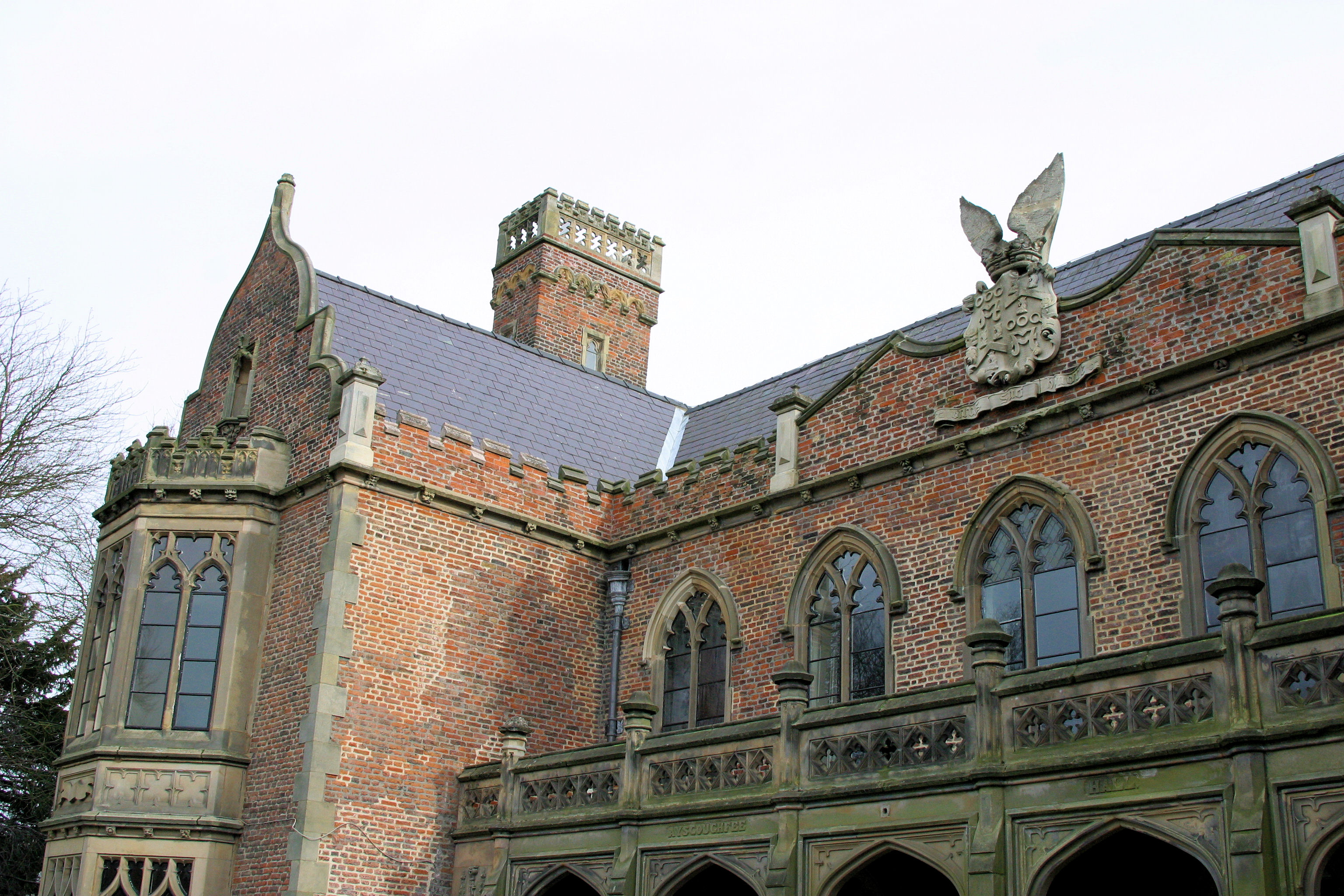
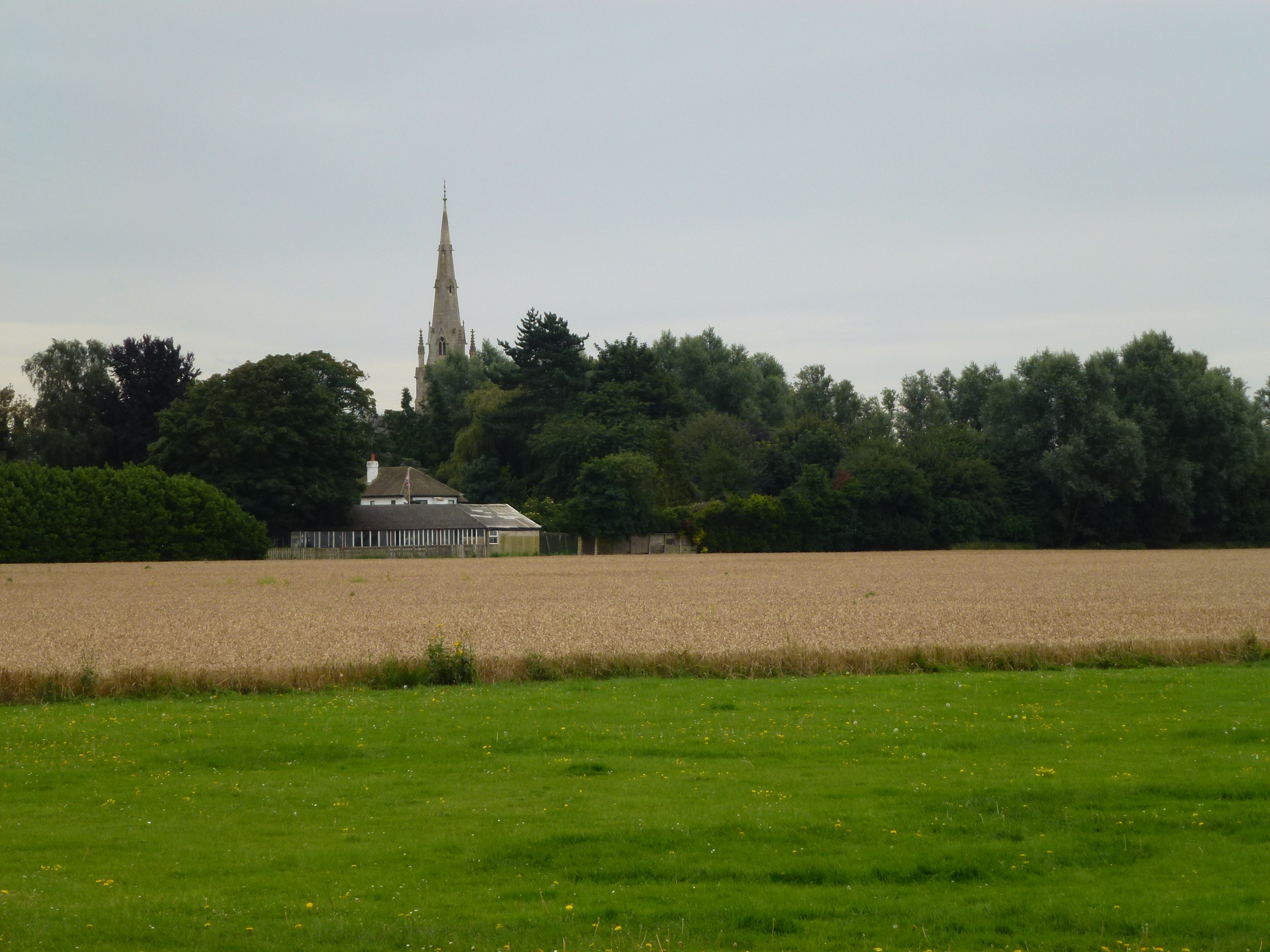
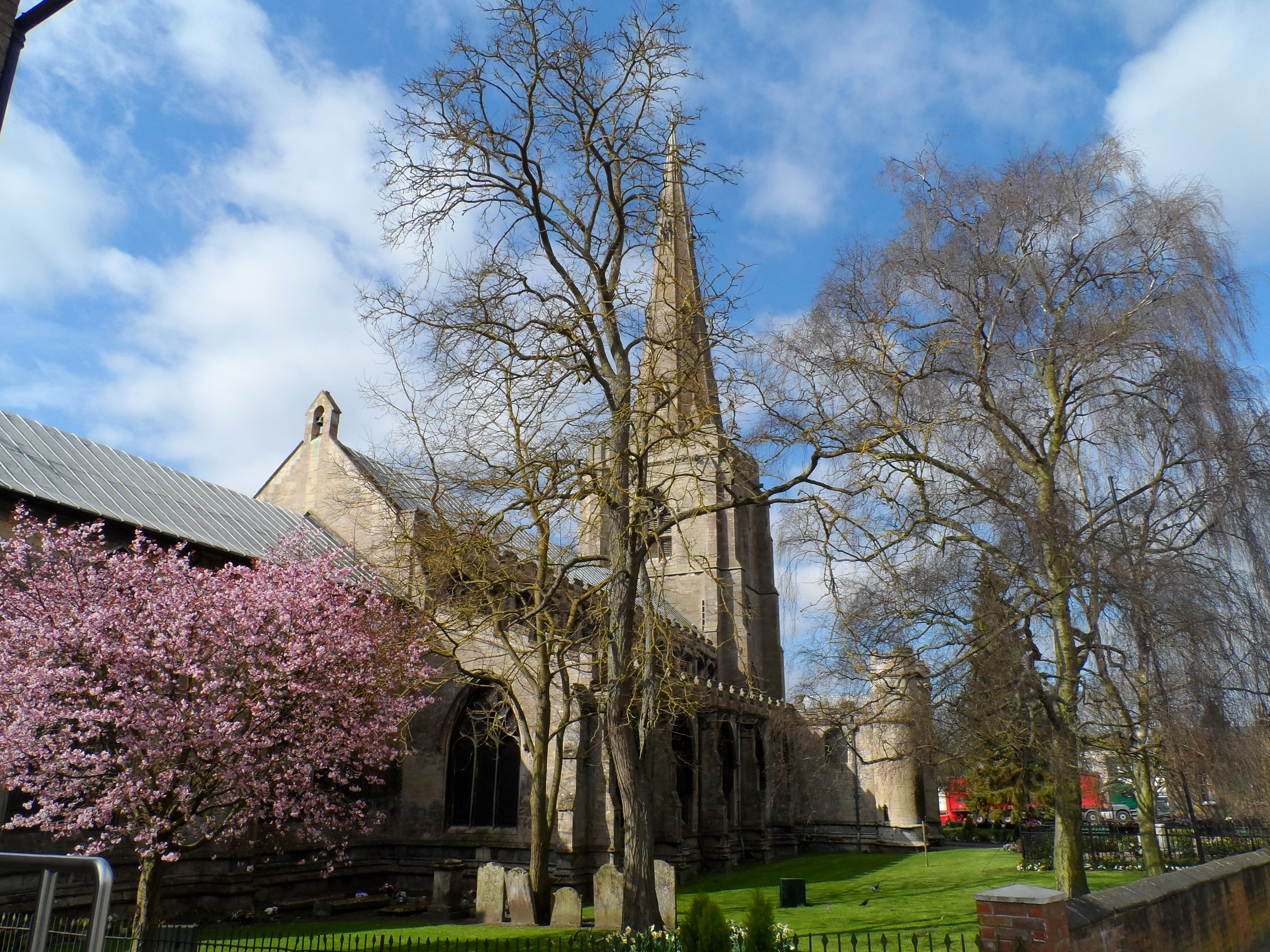
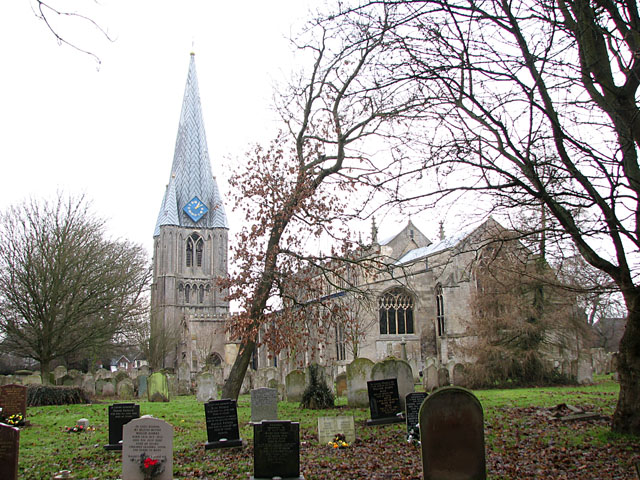
Notable Landmarks of South Holland

Landmarks from top left to bottom right:

1. Trinity Bridge
2. Crowland Abbey
3. Crosskeys Bridge, Sutton Bridge
4. Spalding Parish Church
5. Sessions House, Spalding
6. Ayscoughfee Hall, Spalding
7. Skyline of Deeping St Nicholas in the Deepings
8. Holbeach
9. Long Sutton

== Demographics ==
There were 76,512 residents in the district at the 2001 census. The median age was nearly 43. 82.6% of people in the district claimed to adhere to a Christian religion – the highest proportion of any district in the East Midlands.

The 2011 census reports 88,270 people at 1.2 per hectare in 37,264 households.

Much of the district is low-lying and highly fertile agricultural land which is protected from flooding by land drainage. This is the responsibility of the South Holland Internal Drainage Board and the Environment Agency.

== Media ==
In terms of television, the area is served by BBC Yorkshire and Lincolnshire and ITV Yorkshire broadcast from the Belmont transmitter. BBC East Midlands and ITV Central can also be received from the Waltham TV transmitter. With the co-channel interference from the Waltham transmitter, a small number of households in the southern tip of the district are able to receive BBC East and ITV Anglia.

Radio stations for the area are:

- BBC Radio Lincolnshire on 104.7 FM and 94.9 FM
- BBC Radio Cambridgeshire can also be received on 95.7 FM,
- Lincs FM on DAB
- Greatest Hits Radio Lincolnshire on 96.7FM and 102.2 FM
- Connect Radio on 106.8 FM
- Heart East on 102.7 FM
- Tulip Radio (for Spalding) on 107.5 FM

== Arms ==
Coat of arms of South Holland District

Crest
On a wreath of the colours a heron Proper supporting with the dexter foot a cornucopia erect Or replenished with flowers fruit and cereals Proper.
Escutcheon
Barry wavy of six Azure and Argent in front of two crosiers in saltire a representation of the Elloe Stone issuant on a chief Or an open book Proper edged Or bound between two tulip heads Gules.
Motto
Progress Through Endeavour
Badge
In front of two crosiers in saltire a representation of the Elloe Stone Or.
