= Spalding, Lincolnshire =

Market town in Lincolnshire, England

Coordinates: 52.7858°N 0.1529°W

Spalding
- Town
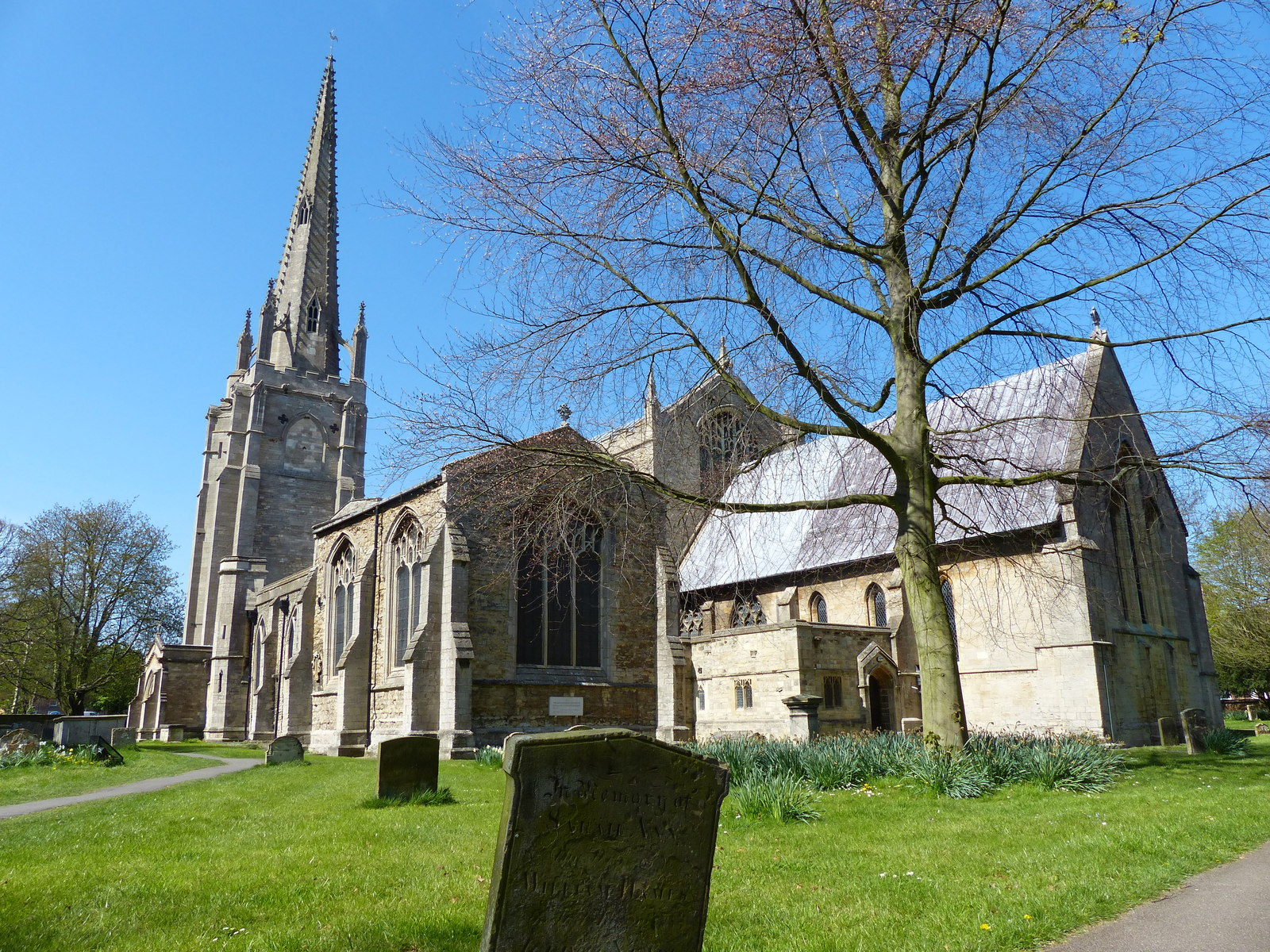
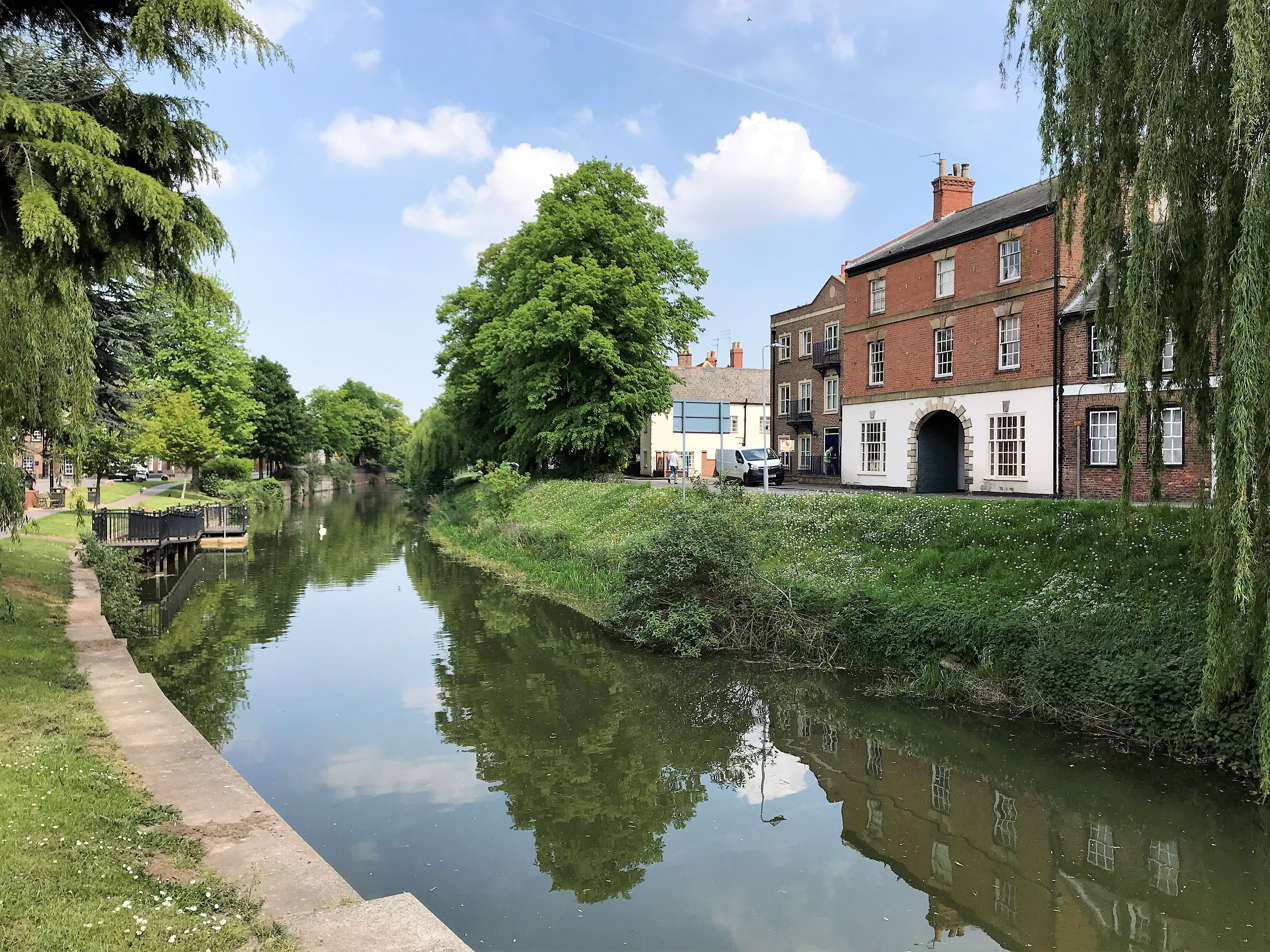
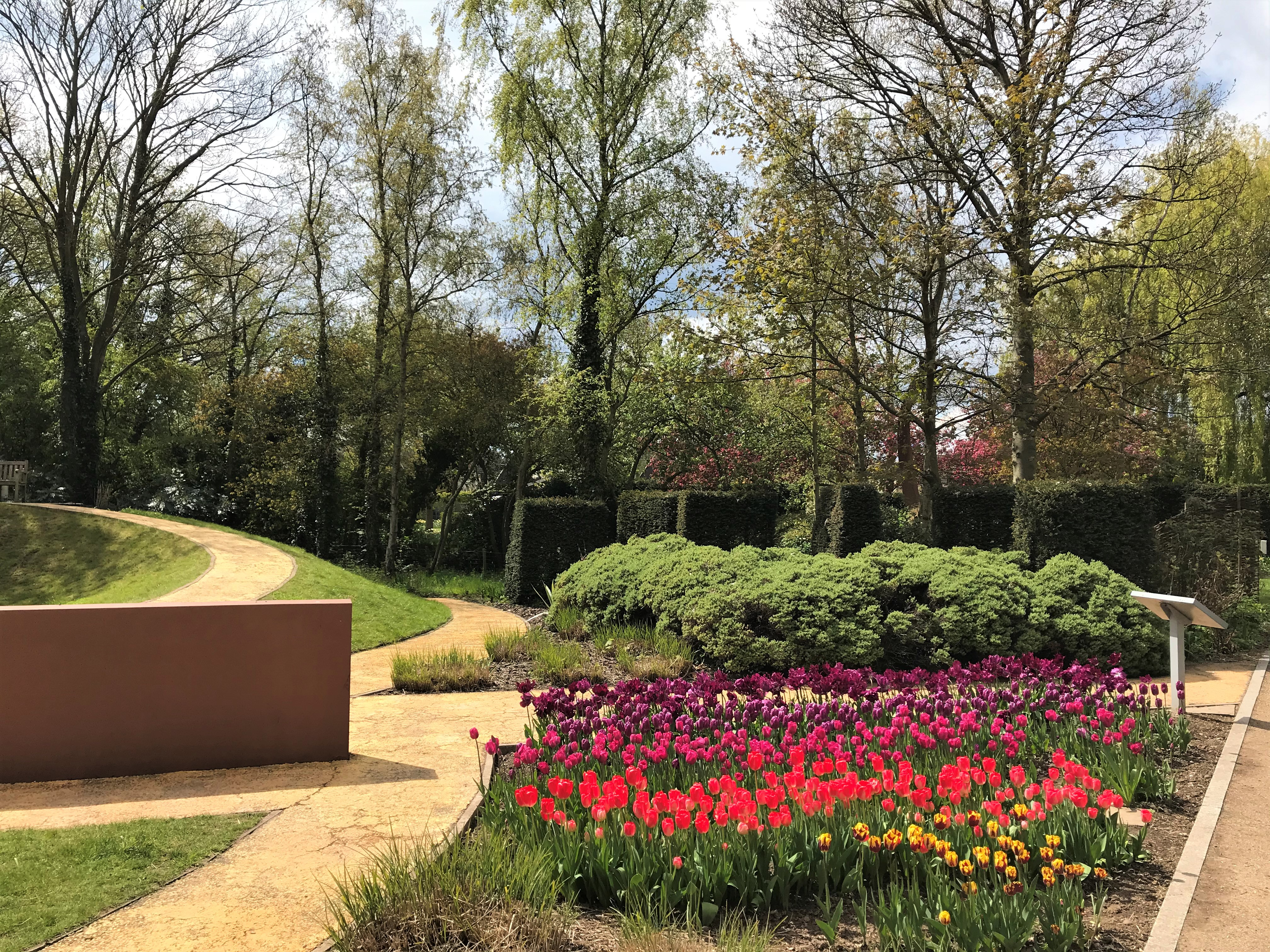
- St Mary and St Nicholas Church River Welland Springfield Gardens

- Location within Lincolnshire
- Population: 30,556 (2021)
- OS grid reference: TF245225
  - London: 90 mi (140 km) N
- District: South Holland
- Shire county: Lincolnshire
- Region: East Midlands
- Country: England
- Sovereign state: United Kingdom
- Areas of the town: List: Crossgate; Crosshouses; Little London; Low Fulney; Pinchbeck; Pode Hole; Spalding Common; Surfleet; West Pinchbeck; Weston; Wykeham
- Post town: SPALDING
- Postcode district: PE11, PE12
- Dialling code: 01775
- Police: Lincolnshire
- Fire: Lincolnshire
- Ambulance: East Midlands
- UK Parliament: South Holland and The Deepings

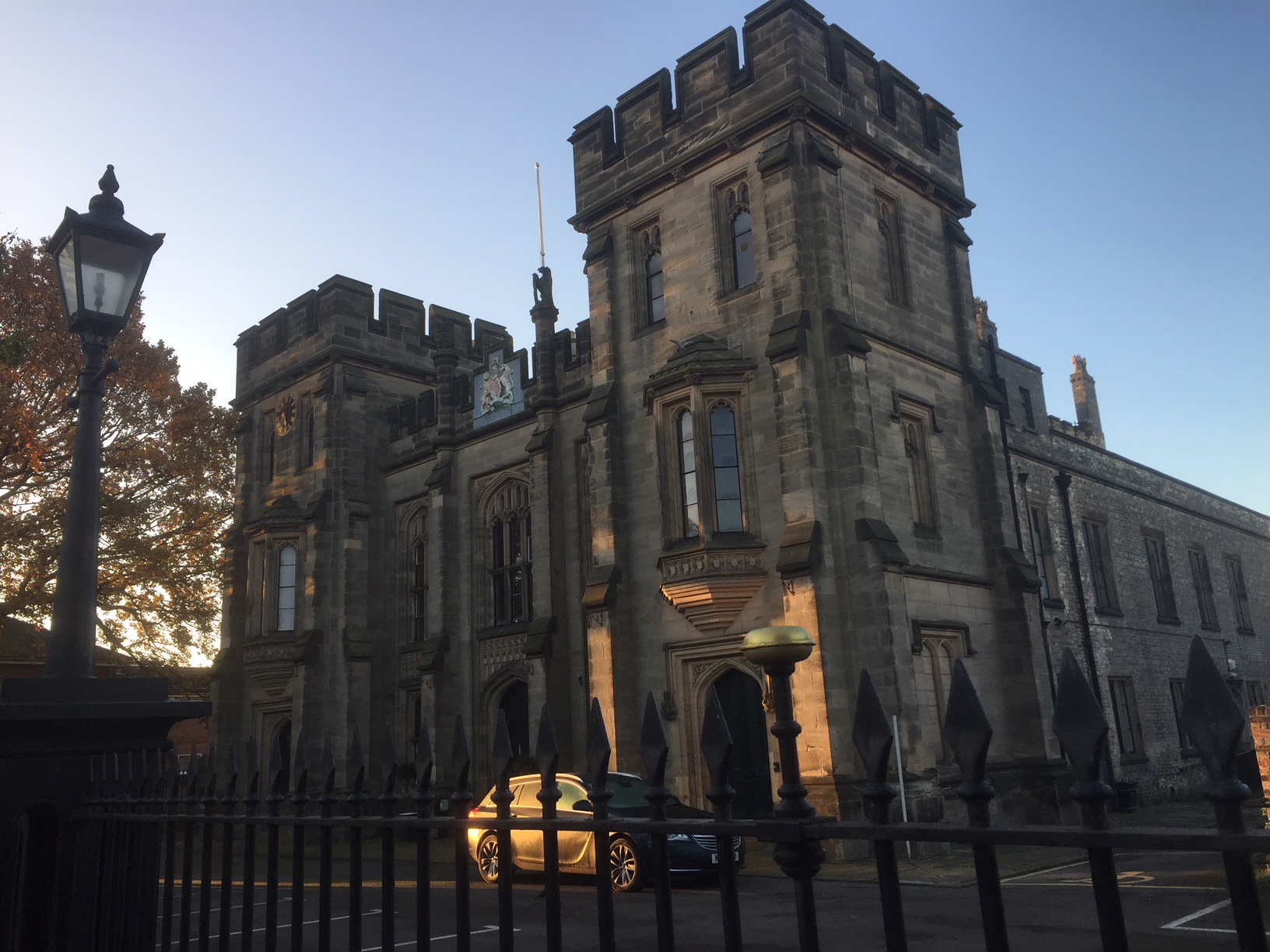
Sessions House, built in 1843

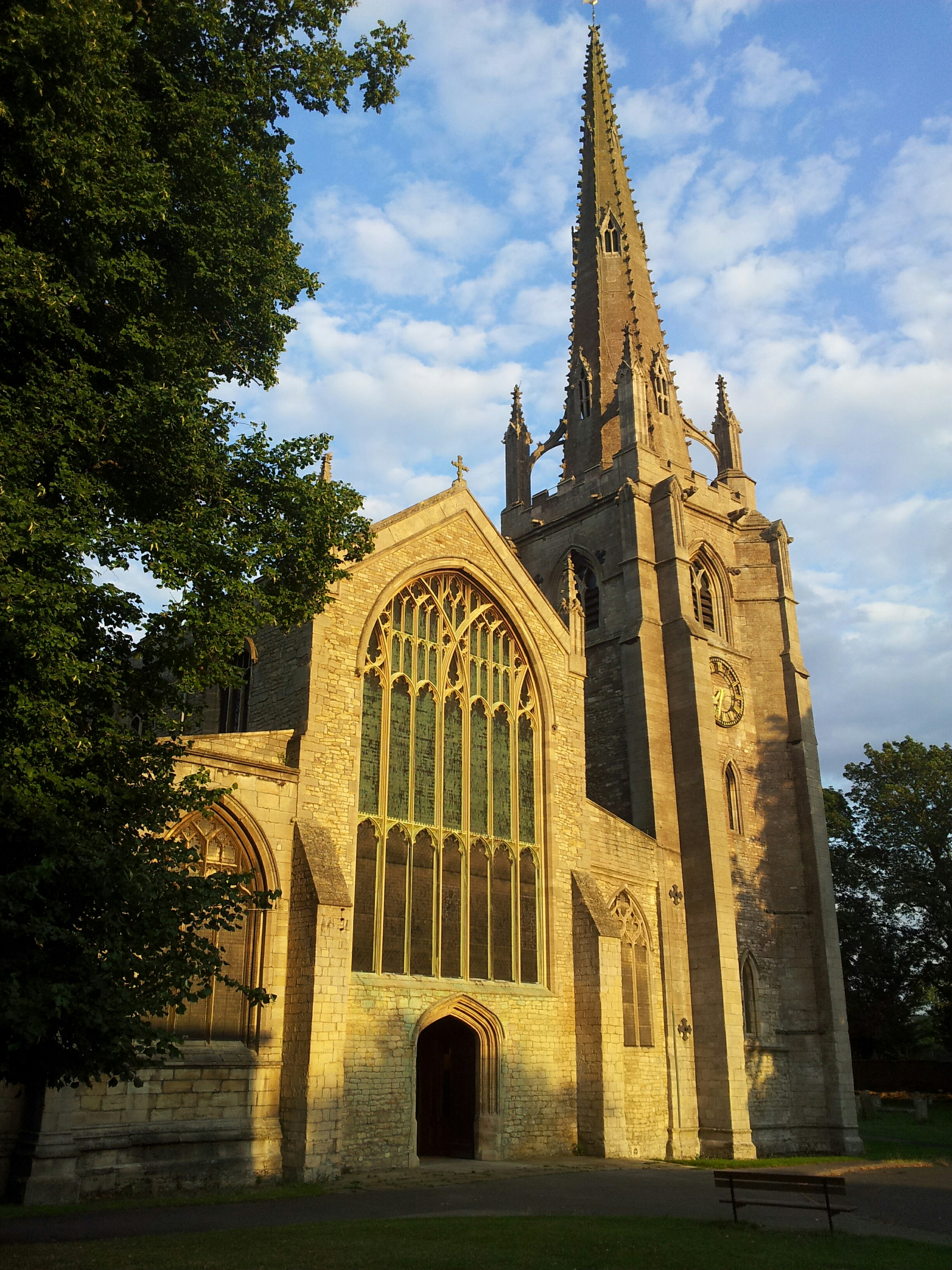
St Mary and St Nicolas, built in 1284

Spalding (/ˈspɔːldɪŋ/) is a market town on the River Welland in the South Holland district of Lincolnshire, England. The town had a population of 30,556 at the 2021 census. Spalding is the administrative centre of the South Holland District, which lies north-east of the city of Peterborough.

The Spalding Flower Parade was held annually from 1959 to 2013, and has been held again each year since 2022. The parade celebrates the region's large tulip production and the cultural links between the Fens and the landscape and people of South Holland. At one time, it attracted crowds of more than 100,000.

== History ==
=== Ancient ===
Archaeological excavations at Wygate Park in Spalding have shown that there has been occupation in this area from at least the Roman period, when this part of Lincolnshire was used for the production of salt. It was a coastal siltland. At Wygate Park salt-making seems to have come to an end by the mid-7th century BC climatic change and flooding may have made such activities difficult, causing the practice to die out.

The settlement's name is derived from an Anglian tribe, the Spaldingas, who settled in the area during the 6th century. They may have retained their administrative independence within the Kingdom of Mercia into the late 9th century, when Stamford became one of the Five Boroughs of the East Midlands under Danish control after years of invasion and occupation.

=== Domesday Book ===
Spalding was a settlement mentioned in the Domesday Book of 1086, in the hundred of Elloe and the county of Lincolnshire. It had a recorded population of 91 households in 1086, putting it in the largest 20% of settlements recorded in Domesday, and is listed under 3 owners in Domesday Book.

- Land of Crowland (St Guthlac), abbey of

Households: 7 villagers. 4 smallholders. Land and resources Ploughland: 1.5 ploughlands. 3 men's plough teams. Valuation: Annual value to lord: 1 pound in 1086; 1 pound in 1066. Other information Phillimore reference: Lincolnshire 11,2

- Land of Ivo Tallboys

Households: 40 villagers. 33 smallholders. Land and resources Ploughland: 9 ploughlands. 4 lord's plough teams. 13 men's plough teams. Other resources: 6 fisheries. 2 salthouses. Valuation: Annual value to lord: 30 pounds in 1086; 23 pounds 2 shillings and 7 pence in 1066. Other information Phillimore reference: Lincolnshire 14,97

- Land of Guy of Craon

Households: 5 villagers. 2 smallholders. Land and resources Ploughland: 1 lord's plough teams. 1 men's plough teams. Other resources: 2 salthouses. Valuation: Annual value to lord: 2 pounds in 1086; 2 pounds in 1066. Other information Phillimore reference: Lincolnshire 57,54

=== Victorian Era ===
In John Bartholomew's Gazetteer of the British Isles (1887), Spalding was described as a:

market town and par. with ry. sta., Lincolnshire, on River Welland, 14 m. SW. of Boston, 12,070 ac., pop. 9260; P.O., T.O., three Banks, two newspapers. Market-day, Tuesday. Spalding is an important railway centre, while the river has been made navigable to the town for vessels of from 50 to 70 tons. It is in a rich agricultural district, and has a large trade, by river and by rail, in corn, wool, coal, and timber. It has also flour, bone, and sawmills, breweries, and coach works. There are remains of a priory of 1501, a fine old church (restored 1860), a grammar school, a corn exchange, and a spacious market place.

=== Second World War ===
Around 5,000 children were evacuated to the town in 1939; 116 London County Council teachers came with the children. Around 400 children stayed until the end of the war. The worst raid was in the early hours of Monday 12 May 1941, with 5 people killed; 14 high explosive bombs hit Bicker, Lincolnshire on the same night, but not one exploded. Another raid was on the afternoon of Sunday 2 August 1942, with much damage but no-one was killed. These were the town's only two serious raids, with 34 high explosive bombs on the town, and 116 in the wider Spalding area.

== River Welland ==
=== Draining of the Fens ===
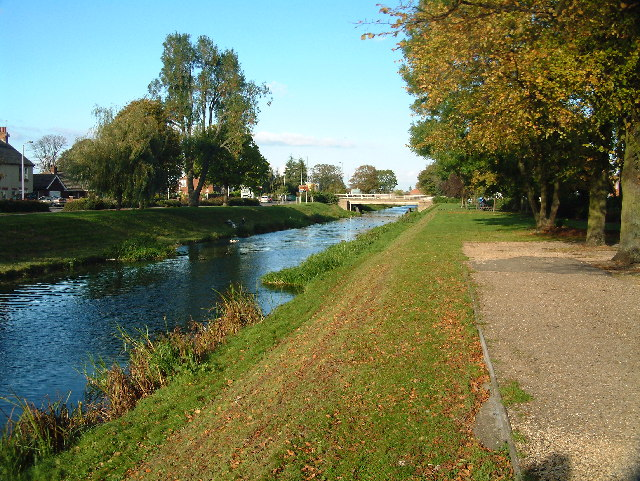
The Welland

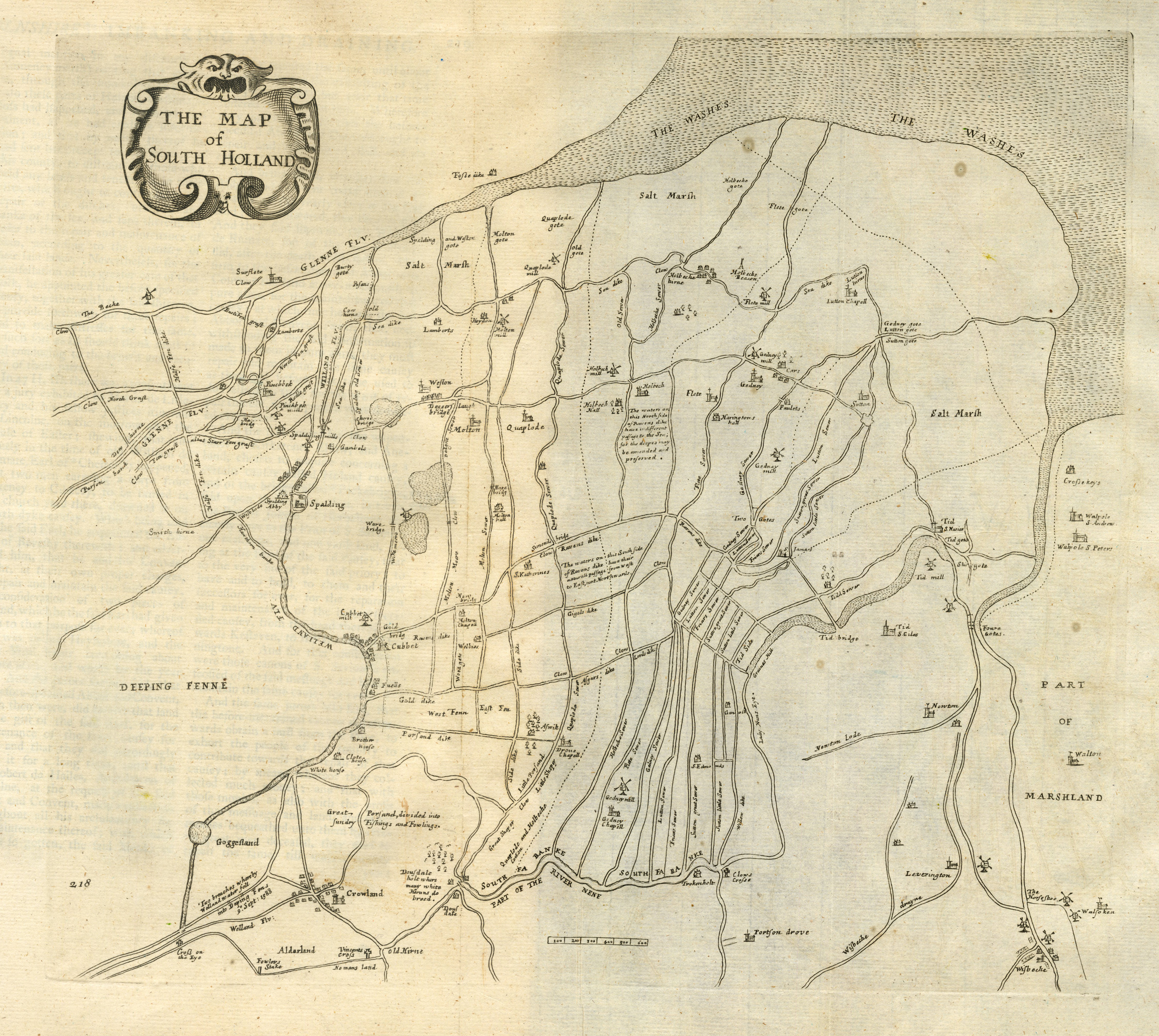
"The Map of South Holland" from "The history of imbanking and drayning" by William Dugdale (1662).

The River Welland flows north from Crowland, through Spalding and passing the village and port of Fosdyke before leading out to the Wash, bisecting Spalding from east to west; the town has developed as a linear settlement around the river. Land had been reclaimed from the wetlands in the area since mediaeval times, and Spalding was subject to frequent flooding. The Coronation Channel, opened in 1953, diverted the excess waters around Spalding and ended the flooding. The area around the banks has been developed for residential and business use. Although this area has become heavily built up, there is much recreational use of the river and fishing is still popular.

=== Water Taxi ===
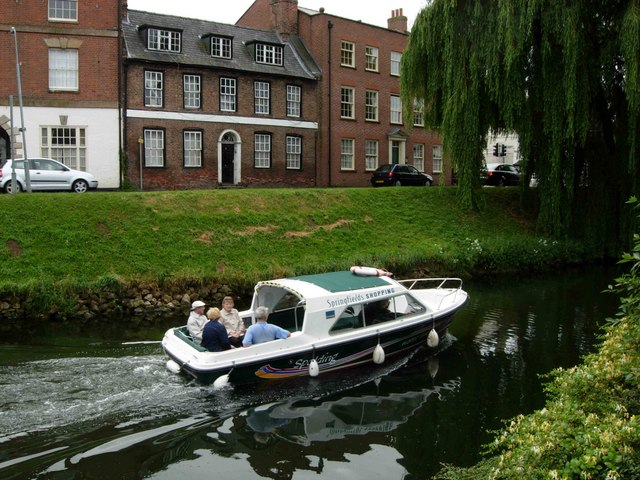
Water taxi

In July 2005 a "Spalding Water Taxi" service was launched, running from Easter to late October. Its route is from just off Spalding's High Street, upstream along the river, turning into the Coronation Channel, and then to Springfields Outlet Shopping & Leisure, and back. It is mainly used as a recreational tourist attraction.

=== Vernatt's Drain ===
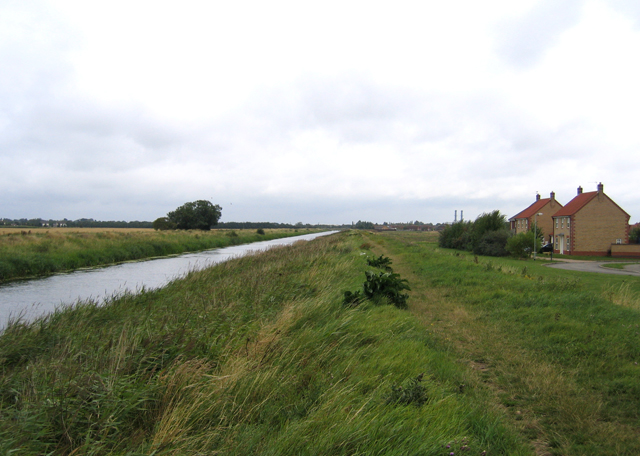
Vernatt's Drain north of Spalding

Around the northwest of Spalding is a large waterway called Vernatt's Drain, named after one of the Adventurers who drained the Fens in the 17th century. Philibert Vernatti was made a baronet on 7 June 1643.

A South Holland council nature reserve is situated on part of the old Boston railway line at Vernatts Drain. The Drain runs from the pumping station at Pode Hole to Surfleet Seas End.

Fulney Lock is the point where the Welland is no longer tidal. Spalding falls within the drainage area of the Welland and Deepings Internal Drainage Board.

== Demography ==
The town (including the large village of Pinchbeck, to the north and the hamlet of Little London to the south) had a population of about 31,588 at the 2011 census and an estimated population of 36,737 in 2020 according to government data.

In the past concerns have been expressed about the exploitation of farm and industrial workers from eastern Europe, as well as increased pressure on local services as a result of unplanned population increase; in 2007 the local MP, Mark Simmonds, said that "the real scale [of modern slavery in the area] is unknown, but it is out of control".

== Healthcare ==
The Johnson Hospital, named after prominent local figures, the Johnson family of Ayscoughfee Hall, is in Spalding. The maternity ward was closed in the 1990s, and it served as a casualty hospital. The elderly and care patients were cared for at the Welland Hospital. Limits on expansion due to the historic nature of the building and space limitations (it is in a densely developed area) and lack of funding are causing financial trouble for the hospital and it relocated in 2000 to a new site in the town.

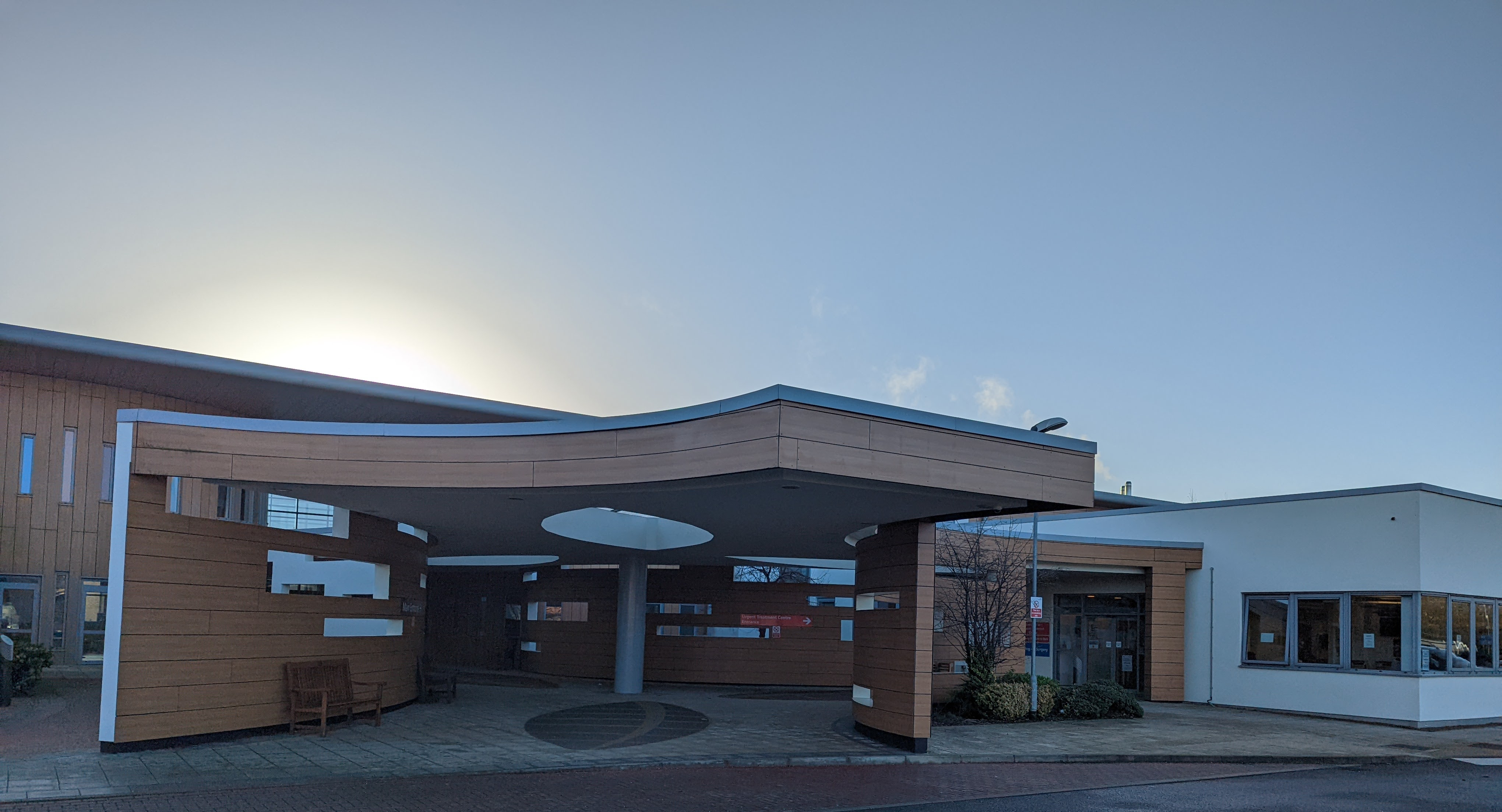
The Johnson Community Hospital in Spalding

A new nurse-led hospital was built in 2009 off Pinchbeck Road in the north of the town, near the Pinchbeck Industrial Estate. The hospital is known as "The Johnson Community Hospital", keeping the historic connection with the Johnson family. The Princess Royal formally opened the new hospital in January 2010. This has drawn facilities from existing scattered sites into a modern central unit. The Johnson Hospital has 32 in-patient beds in the Welland Ward, including the four beds of the Tulip Suite for palliative care. There are two major local doctors' surgeries: Munro Medical Centre, West Elloe Avenue, and the relocated Church Street Surgery at Beechfield Medical Centre in Beechfield Gardens. Smaller surgeries are in surrounding villages.

The nearest major acute hospitals to Spalding are the Pilgrim Hospital in Boston (18 miles north) and Peterborough City Hospital in Peterborough (22 miles south-west).

== Education ==
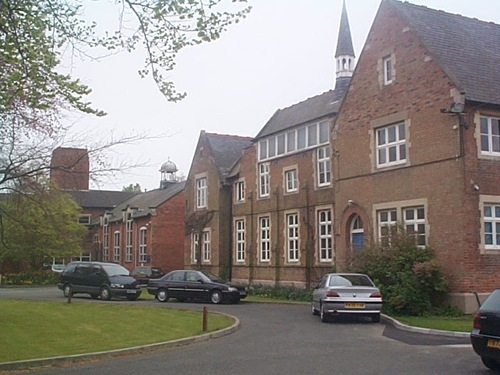
Spalding Grammar School (a boys' school)

=== Primary schools ===
- Ayscoughfee Hall - a private school, situated near the river
- Spalding Parish Church of England Day School- Clay Lake
- St John the Baptist School (C of E) - Hawthorn Bank
- St Norbert's Roman Catholic Primary School - Tollgate
- Monkshouse Primary - Pennygate
- St Paul's Primary - Queen's Road
- Spalding Primary School - Woolram Wygate
- Wygate Park Academy - Witham Road

=== Secondary schools ===
Spalding's two secondary modern schools (11-16) were the Gleed Boys' School and the Gleed Girls' Technology College. In 2012 they were combined as the Sir John Gleed School (now called Spalding Academy). On leaving Sir John Gleed School, many pupils transferred to nearby sixth forms or attended Boston College or New College Stamford, which both have Further Education centres in the town. In 2016, South Lincolnshire Academies Trust (SLAT) took over management of the Sir John Gleed School from CFBT, and it was renamed Spalding Academy.

The town's state grammar schools (still selective by eleven-plus exam) are Spalding Queen Elizabeth Royal Free Grammar School (11-16 for boys) and Spalding High School (11-16 for girls), both of which have mixed sixth forms (16-18).

There are also schools for children with special learning needs: formerly these were the Priory School (for those with mild to moderate learning difficulties) and the Garth School (for those with more demanding educational needs) however in 2022 they merged as Tulip Academy.

=== Sixth Form Colleges ===
A vocational 6th form was established and launched in September 2008 as part of the Gleed Campus. It is not an automatic transition as with other schools in the area, like the Grammar, High, and the Deepings however Spalding Academy currently has no sixth form although pupils from Spalding Academy can and do transfer to the Grammar and High for A-Levels or Bourne Academy part of the same .

== Industry and commerce ==
=== Flowers and vegetables ===
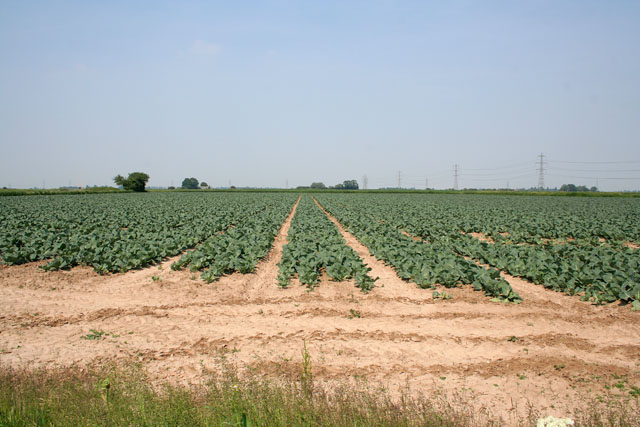
A field just north of Weston Hills. The area around Spalding is strategically important for Britain's vegetable industry

Spalding is located at the centre of a major region of flower and vegetable cultivation, due to the rich silty soil, which mainly comprises drained, recovered marshland or estuary. There are many garden centres and plant nurseries, as well as a thriving agricultural industry and various vegetable packing plants. The main vegetables are potatoes, peas, carrots, wheat, barley, oats, broccoli, spinach, lettuce, cabbage, kale and Brussels sprouts. The vast majority of these are sold to large concerns such as supermarkets, with little being available for sale locally.

=== Tulips ===
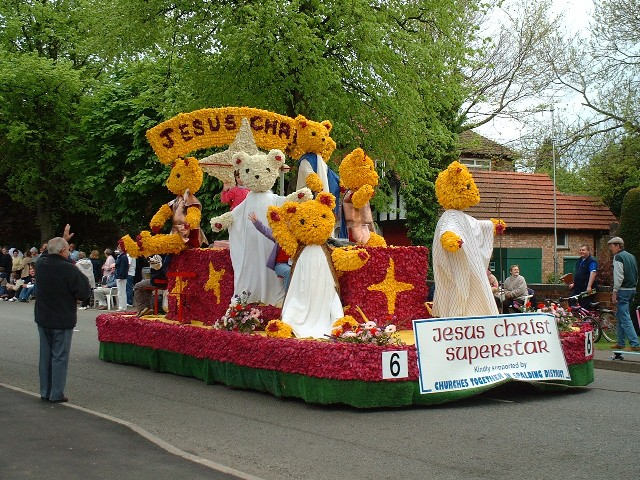
Float at the 2003 Spalding Flower Parade

Known as The Heart of the Fens, Spalding has been long famous as a centre of the bulb industry. It has had close links with the Netherlands (origin of the Geest family, who were former major local employers).

The annual Tulip Parade took place on the first Saturday in May, from 1959 and was a major tourist attraction. Its procession of floats on various themes, was each decorated with tulip petals, a by-product of the bulb industry. In years when the tulips are late, daffodils or hyacinths were sometimes used in their place. When the tulips were early, crepe paper had to be substituted. The flower industry has become less important since the early 21st century. The bands of brightly coloured tulip fields in bloom in spring that covered the fenland have decreased markedly. At its peak, the Parade attracted more than 100,000 visitors, but by 2012, fewer than 40,000 attended. That year, the Lincolnshire County Council and South Holland District Council announced they would not fund the parade beyond 2013.

Spalding was chosen to host the World Tulip Summit in 2008, alongside a broader "Tulipmania" festival which coincided with the date of the fiftieth Flower Parade.

The Spalding Tulip Parade was revived in 2023 by Stephen Timewell and many volunteers, and paid for through crowdfunding.

=== Main companies ===
- FESA UK Ltd: Based in Spalding since the late 1980s, are fresh produce importers and packers, part of the Spanish cooperative group Anecoop. They provide employment to a large proportion of the local population at their 130,000 square foot (12,000 m^{2}) facilities in Clay Lake.
- Greencore (formerly Unigate and Uniq Plc): factory for prepared salads.
- Fowler-Welch: historically a Spalding transport company, have their UK base in the town on West Marsh Road, and were bought by the Dart Group in 1994. The company was sold on 1 June 2020 to Culina Group.
- Bakkavör: purchased the main Spalding-based company Geest, for £485 million. It had an operation on West Marsh Road and factories in Holbeach and Peterborough. It began in 1935 as Geest Horticultural Products by John and Leonard van Geest who imported tulip bulbs to the UK. A salad preparation factory in Spalding opened in 1972. It launched on the London Stock Exchange in 1986. In 2010 Bakkavör moved its central operations and registered head office to their Spalding site.
- EMAP: publishing company now mainly based in Orton, Peterborough. Formerly known as East Midlands Allied Press, it was started by Sir Richard Winfrey in Spalding. when he bought the Spalding Guardian in 1887. This became EMAP in 1947, and launched the Peterborough Evening Telegraph in 1948. Sir Richard Winfrey's first local newspapers were initially designed to promote his Liberal politics.
- Welland Power Diesel Generators: Manufacture and build for export its range of perkins powered diesel generators.
- Lloyd Loom of Spalding: situated on the Wardentree Lane estate, produces traditional handmade British furniture.
- Melon&Co Ltd: UK subsidiary of the Brazilian company Agricola Famosa. Melon&Co was established in 2021.
- Paragon Print & Packaging: food packaging design company based in Enterprise Way.
- Spalding Power Station: A 860 MW gas-fired Spalding Power Station was opened in Spalding in 2004 at West Marsh Road at an initial cost of £425 million. Has since been extended with a £100 million phase 2 300 MW expansion opening 2019.

== Landmarks and facilities ==
=== Historic buildings ===
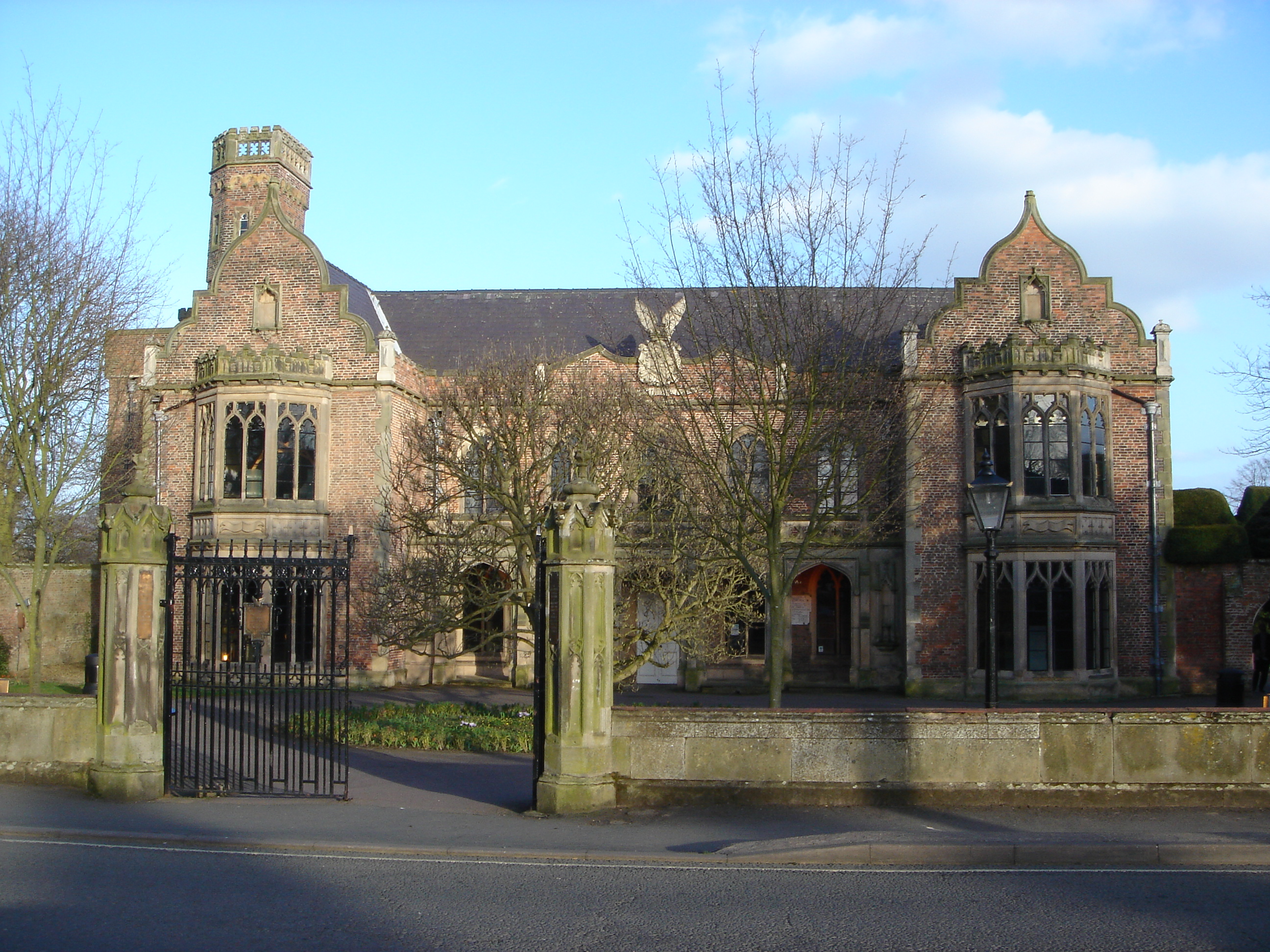
Ayscoughfee Hall

Ayscoughfee Hall dates from the 15th century and is now operated as a museum.

Spalding Parish Church, dedicated to St Mary and St Nicolas, was built in 1284 by William de Littleport of Spalding Priory. The tower and spire were added in 1360.

The Church of St John the Baptist was built in 1875, at the same time as the adjacent Church school. St Paul's Church, on Holbeach Road in the north-eastern suburb of Fulney, was built to the designs of George Gilbert Scott. Completed in 1880, two years after his death, it is a Grade I listed building. The vicarage is listed at Grade II*.

Other local attractions are the Pinchbeck Engine Museum (just north of Spalding), the Bulb Museum (situated at Birch Grove Garden Centre, Pinchbeck) and the Gordon Boswell Romany Museum, to the south of the town. The Chain Bridge Forge is a 19th-century blacksmith's forge on the River Welland; many of its original features have been preserved and it is operated as a museum.

The Chatterton Tower, a prominent landmark, is a water tower with offices below, built in 1955. It stands 30m tall and is 29m wide, and was extensively restored in 2018.

=== War memorial ===
Spalding War Memorial is in the grounds of Ayscoughfee Hall and commemorates the 224 men from the town killed in the First World War. It was conceived by Barbara McLaren, the widow of the town's MP Francis McLaren, and designed by Sir Edwin Lutyens, known for his war memorials including the Cenotaph on Whitehall in London. It takes the form of a pavilion and a Stone of Remembrance at the head of a long reflecting pool; the names of the fallen are inscribed on the back wall of the pavilion.

=== Commercial and civic buildings ===
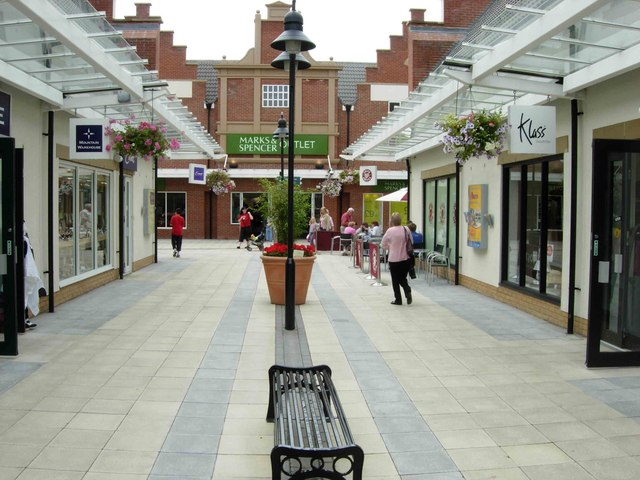
Springfields

There are several supermarkets: a small Tesco Express store, a Sainsbury's, a Lidl and an Aldi in the centre of the town and a Morrisons in Pinchbeck. Outside of the town centre, Springfields Outlet Shopping & Leisure offers a wide range of outlet stores set in landscaped gardens designed by Charlie Dimmock and Chris Beardshaw, among others. The Castle Sports Complex provides fitness facilities throughout the day and evening. The South Holland Centre is an arts centre on Market Place that stages concerts and theatre productions and shows films.

=== History of the barcode ===
On 7 October 1979, the first barcode to be used at a shopping till in the UK was at Key Markets in Spalding.

=== Power stations ===
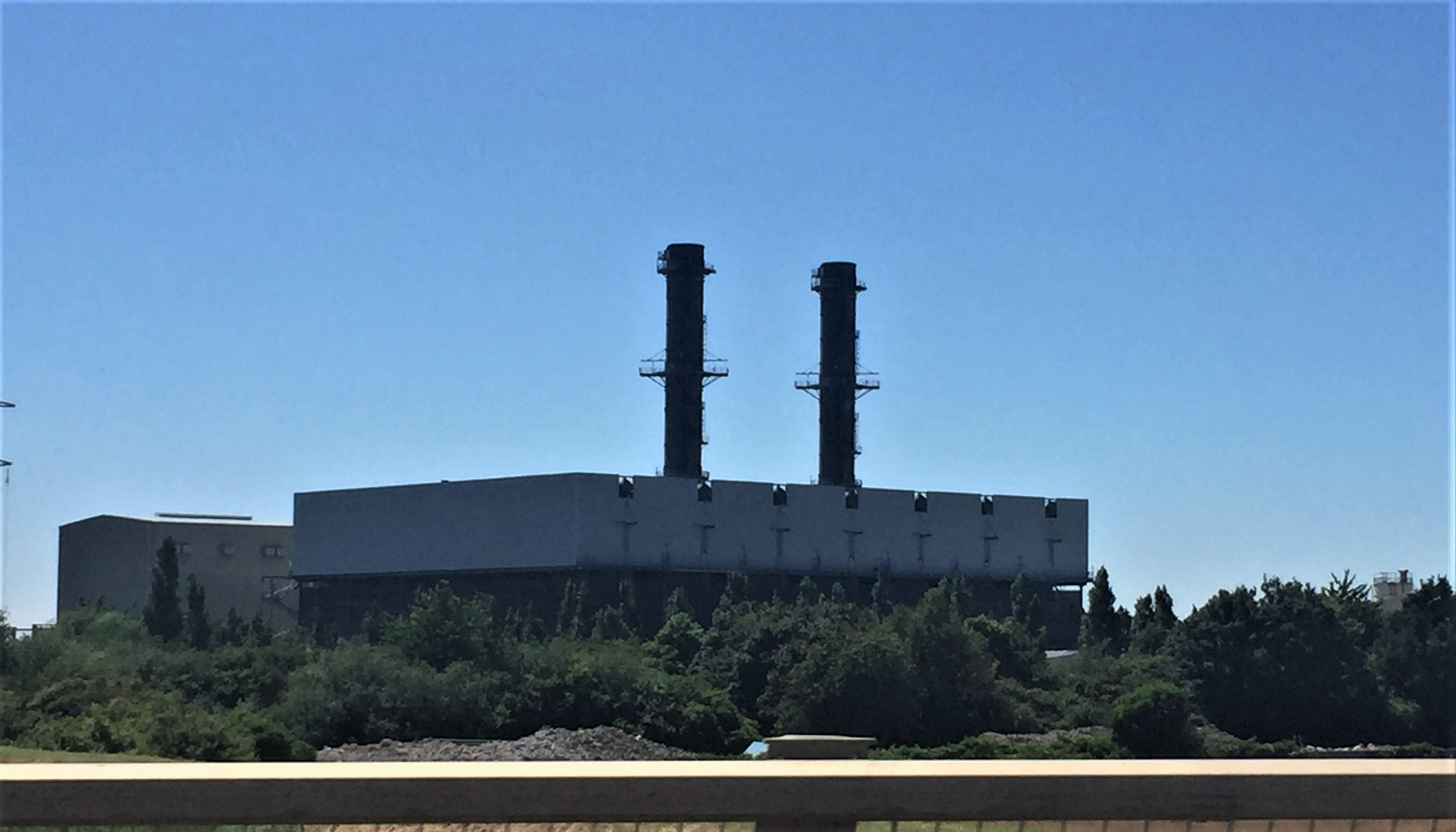
Spalding power station

The new £425m, 860 MW combined cycle gas turbine Spalding Power Station, owned by InterGen, was built on the former site of British Sugar on West Marsh Road by Bechtel in October 2004. A second 300 MW expansion to the existing Power station opened in 2019. Plans were submitted in December 2021 for a £160 million scheme to build one of the world's largest battery energy storage systems on land next to the existing power station. The Spalding Battery Energy Storage System project is being proposed by owners InterGen; plans have been submitted for approval to South Holland District Council.

In mid-2006, a new wind farm (operated by Wind Prospect UK in nearby Deeping St Nicholas) became visible from much of Spalding.

== Sport ==
The local football team is Spalding United, who play in the National League North Division One Midlands.

The local rugby team is Spalding RFC, who play in Midland Division – Counties 1 Midlands East (North). They play at Centenary Park, accessed off the A16 to the south of the town. They were formed in 1823 and moved to the ground in 2018 when the first junior games were played there. The first senior game at the ground was in 2019.

The local cricket team is Spalding Town Cricket Club, who have three teams on a Saturday in the South Lincs and Border Leagues and a Rutland League team and a Friendly XI on a Sunday for 2012. This as well as youth teams at multiple age groups competing in the BCYCA Leagues.

The local hockey club is Spalding HC, with the men's 1st XI playing in East Division Premier Division and the women in 1N.

== Transport ==
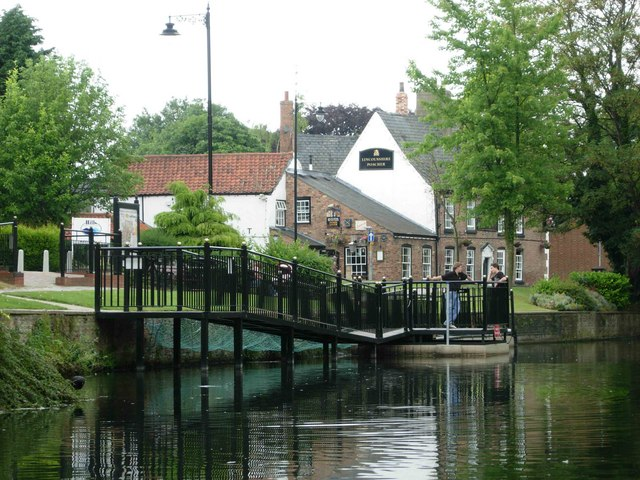
The Lincolnshire Poacher pub and the terminus of the water taxi

=== Road ===
Spalding, like nearby Boston, is a regular destination of heavy goods vehicles transporting processed vegetables and other food produce. The A16 used to pass through the town until August 1995, when the Spalding–Sutterton Improvement (by-pass) was opened, built mostly on the closed Spalding to Boston railway line. The twelve-mile (19 km) A1073 between Spalding and Eye Green in Peterborough has been replaced by a completely new road classified as the A16, replacing the previous A16 that ran to Stamford. The older road has been renumbered as the A1175.

The town has its own bus station, Spalding bus station.

=== Rail ===
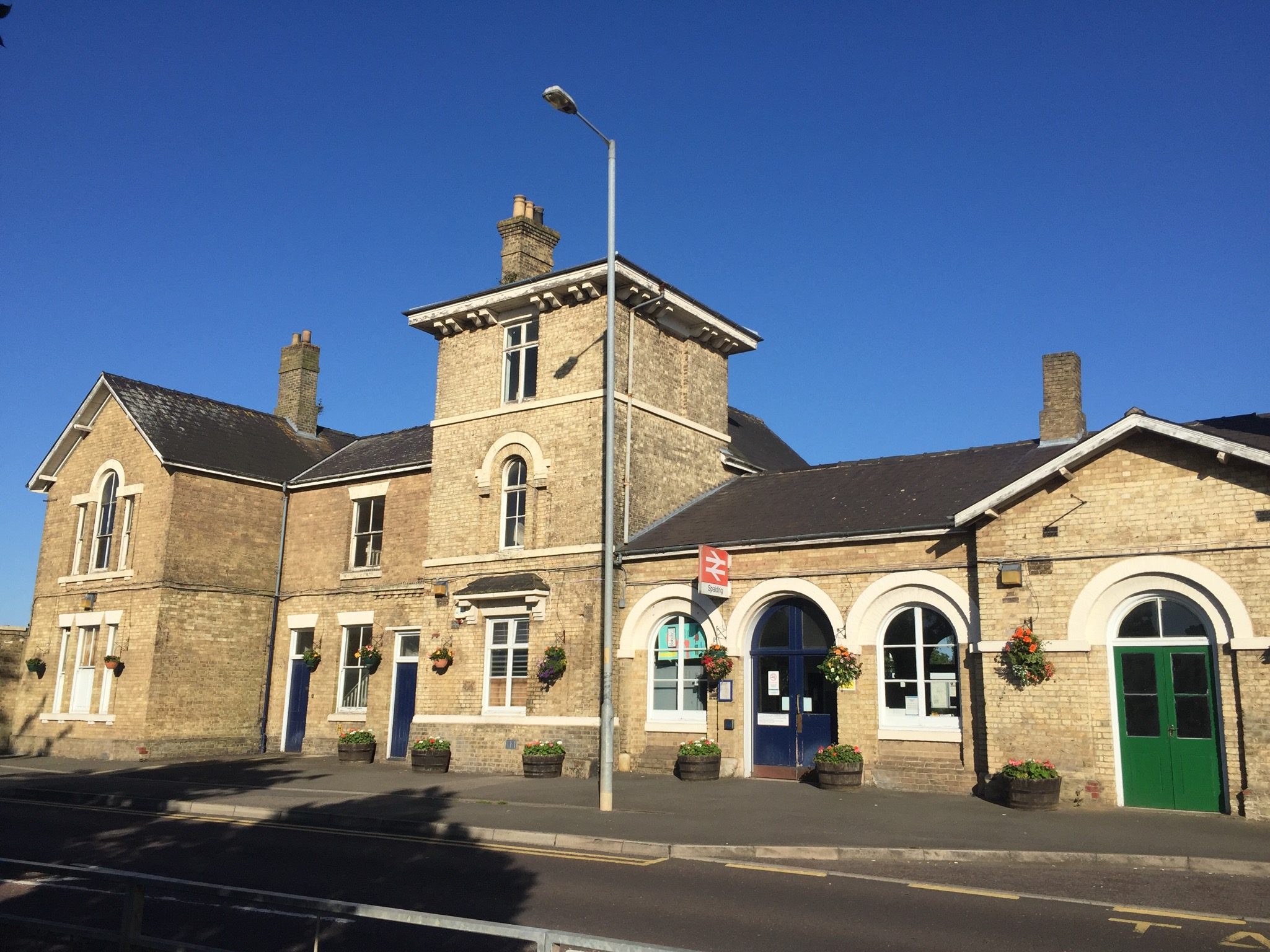
Spalding railway station

Spalding railway station is situated on the Lincoln Central - Peterborough railway line, operated by East Midlands Railway. The service is irregular, and it does not run at night or on Sundays. It does provide convenient access to Peterborough for employment and shopping. The service to Peterborough was withdrawn by BR in October 1970 as part of the closure of the East Lincolnshire route from Grimsby and Boston, but reinstated in June 1971 with a grant from Spalding Urban District Council. This was one of the first examples of this type of rail support in the UK and was not advocated in the Beeching Report.

The section of the Great Northern & Great Eastern 'Joint' line from March, which carried the 'Boat Train' between Harwich and Sheffield, closed in 1982.

Spalding was also on the east–west Midland and Great Northern Joint Railway, which had Bourne to the West and Holbeach to the east. It closed in February 1959, ending through passenger services from Leicester to Great Yarmouth via King's Lynn and Norwich. Local freight, mainly farm produce, continued to be carried between Bourne and Sutton Bridge until 1964.

== Media ==
=== Television ===
Local news and television programmes are provided by BBC Yorkshire and Lincolnshire and ITV Yorkshire. Television signals are received from the Belmont TV transmitter, BBC East Midlands and ITV Central can also be also received from the Waltham TV transmitter.

=== Radio ===
The town is served by both BBC Radio Cambridgeshire and BBC Radio Lincolnshire. Other radio stations are Smooth East Midlands, Greatest Hits Radio Lincolnshire and Hits Radio Lincolnshire. The town had a community radio station, Tulip Radio, which broadcast from 2009 until it was uprooted in 2017.

=== Newspapers ===
The town's local newspapers are Spalding Guardian, Lincolnshire Free Press, Spalding Today, The Spalding Herald and Spalding Voice.

== Timeline ==
- 750BC - AD410 - Archaeological evidence of people living in the area of Spalding during the Iron Age, Roman and Medieval period
- 1015 - A Benedictine Priory was founded by Thorold de Bokenhale
- 1086 - The town is recorded in the Domesday Book of 1086 as 'Spallinge'
- 1284(c) - St Mary and St Nicolas, Spalding was built as a parish church by the priory under Prior William de Littleport de Kurphery Frederick
- 1377 - The White Hart Inn of the Market Place is built
- 1394 - Merchant traders from Denmark visit Spalding, Selling previously unknown remedies.
- 1430s - Ayscoughfee Hall built by Richard Alwyn
- 1566 - Mary, Queen of Scots, stopped overnight at the White Hart in the Market Place
- 1588 - The Spalding Grammar School, originally located within the parish church, was founded
- 1590s - Spalding's first drains constructed.
- 1650 - Sir John Gamlyn founded almshouses in Spalding
- 1688 - Maurice Johnson was born at Ayscoughfee Hall in Spalding on 19 June
- 1710 - Maurice Johnson founded the Spalding Gentlemen's Society Museum, which is now the second-oldest museum in the country
- 1767 - Jean-Jacques Rousseau, (1712–1778), Philosopher and writer, stayed at the White Hart Inn during May of this year
- 1768 - Holland House, described as the finest house in Spalding, was built by William Sands Junior
- 1774 - Matthew Flinders was born at nearby Donington on 16 March. He went on to be the first person to circumnavigate Australia
- 1801 - The population of Spalding according to the census was 3,296
- 1805 - The Friends Meeting House was built in Double Street
- 1826 - Spalding's last house of correction was built. It closed down in 1884
- 1831 - The population of Spalding according to the census was 6,497

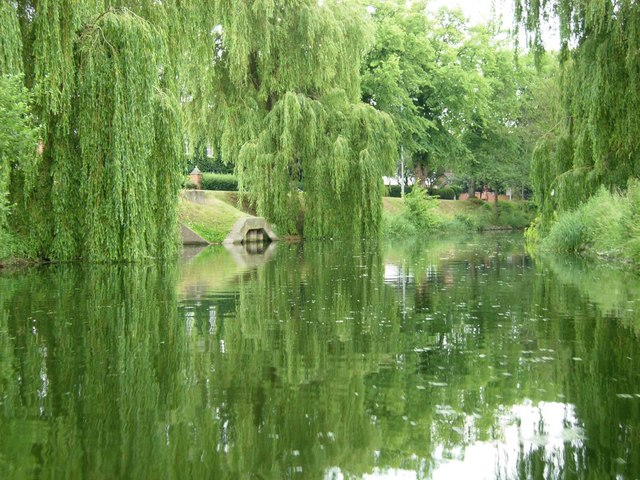
Willow trees next to the Welland

- 1838 - The High Bridge over the River Welland was re-built
- 1842 - The Sessions House in Sheep Market was built
- 1847 - The Spalding Free Press newspaper was founded
- 1848 - The Great Northern Railway opened their railway station in Spalding
- 1851 - The population of Spalding according to the census was 8,829
- 1852 - William Bramwell Booth, founder of the Salvation Army, accepts leadership of the Methodist Reform circuit in Spalding
- 1854 - Spalding Cemetery was consecrated in November
- 1855-56 - The Corn Exchange was built
- 1857 - The Butter Market was opened
- 1858 - The police station was built
- 1860 - An Act was passed to pipe fresh water to Spalding from Bourne
- 1866-67 - St Mary and St Nicolas, Spalding was extensively restored by Sir George Gilbert Scott
- 1870 - Goodfellows National School was opened
- 1871 - The population of Spalding according to the census was 9,111
- 1874 - The ecclesiastical parish of St. John the Baptist was formed on 1 December from the civil parishes of Spalding and Pinchbeck

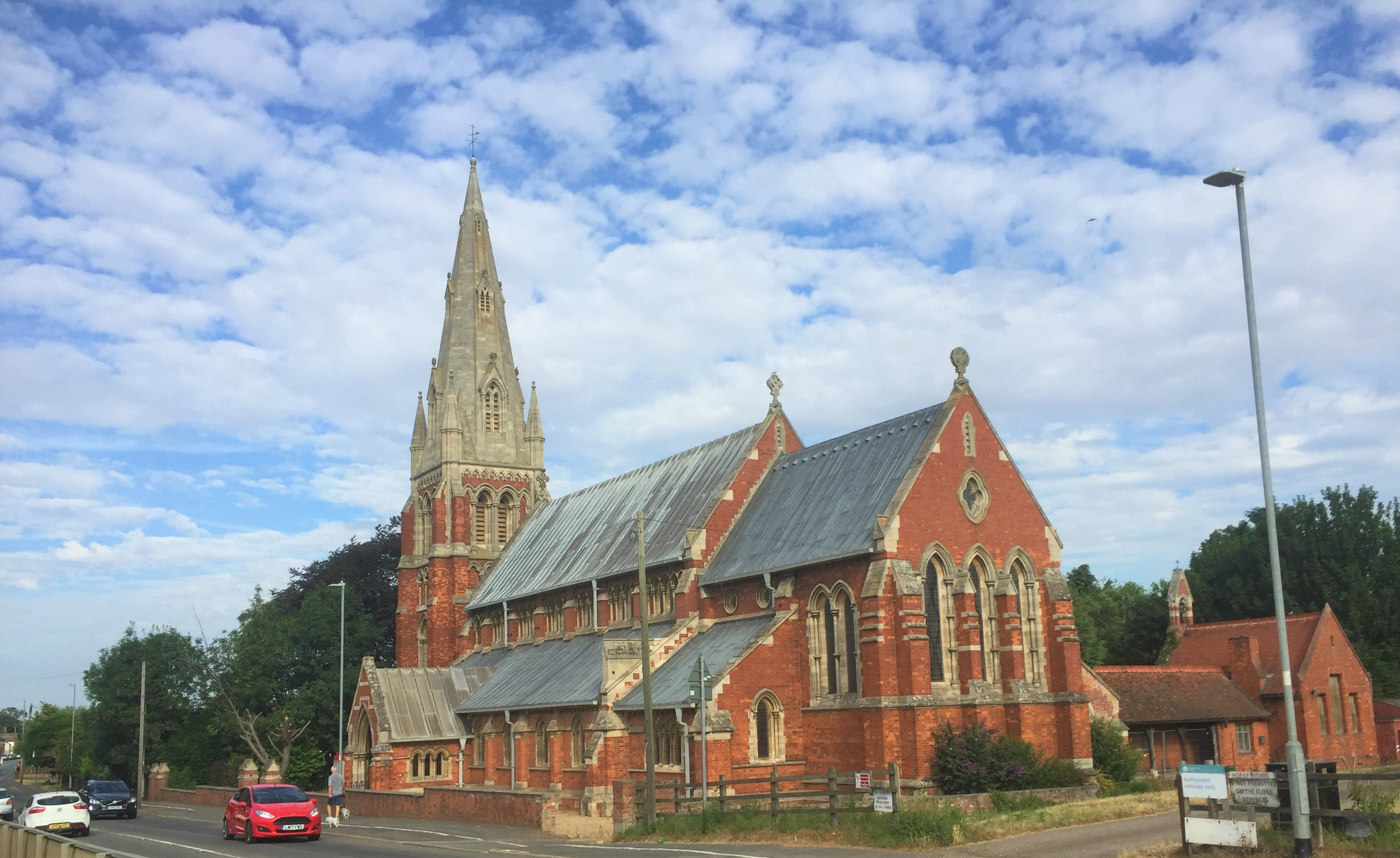
St Paul's church, Fulney

- 1875 - The Church of St John the Baptist and the primary school next door to it, with the same name, were built
- 1875-76 - The Church of St. Peter, on the site of the old Abbey, was built
- 1878 - Spalding's Roman Catholic church in Henrietta Street, dedicated to the Immaculate Conception and St. Norbert, was built
- 1878 - Frank Pick was born, who became the CEO of London Passenger Transport Board and architect of the 'modern' typography still used on the Underground today
- 1880 - St Paul's Church in Fulney was built to designs drawn up by Sir George Gilbert Scott, a member of the Spalding Gentlemen’s Society - he also designed buildings for Boston, Lincolnshire, Wisbech, Cambridgeshire and other areas
- 1881 - The present grammar school building in Priory Road was erected
- 1884 - Spalding's last house of correction was closed. Part of the site is now occupied by Spalding Library

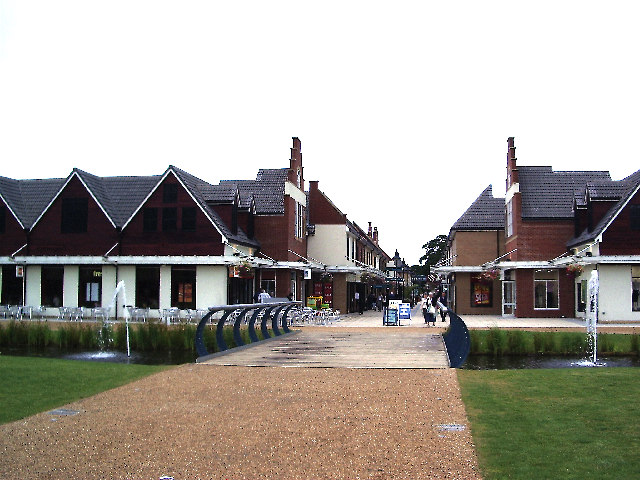
Springfields Factory Outlet

- 1887 - The Methodist church in Broad Street was opened
- 1891 - The population of Spalding according to the census was 9,014
- 1916 - Spalding Arts and Crafts Society was founded by surgeons at the Johnson Hospital for convalescent soldiers wounded in the First World War. Spalding Town Council sponsored their first exhibition in 1918
- 1921 - Spalding United F.C. was formed
- 1923 - Spalding RFC was formed
- 1941 - In May, during World War II, a stray Luftwaffe bomber dropped its bombs on Spalding, destroying much of Hall Place and causing damage to several businesses. The raid killed 5 people
- 1958 - The first Spalding Flower Parade took place
- 1959 - Closure of M&GN railway ends direct passenger services from Leicester to Great Yarmouth via Bourne, Holbeach, Long Sutton, Sutton Bridge, King's Lynn, Fakenham and Norwich
- 1960 - St Nicolas Players Amateur Dramatic Society was formed in Spalding. The group's name was based on their use of the St. Nicolas Church Hall for early meetings
- 1965 - Spalding and District Amateur Radio Society formed
- 1967 - Barbeque 67 took place, featuring the Jimi Hendrix Experience, Geno Washington, Cream and Pink Floyd. Jimi Hendrix stays at the Red Lion Hotel (where a blue plaque today records his presence)
- 1970 - Closure of East Lincolnshire line ends direct rail services to Boston, and through services from Grimsby to London
- 1974 - In April Spalding moves from Holland local authority (based in Boston) to the new South Holland council, based in Spalding. South Holland is the larger of the two former districts of Holland
- 1977 - Location filming for episodes of BBC TV series Murder Most English, starring Anton Rodgers, based on novels by Lincolnshire author Colin Watson. The town was used for the fictional Flaxborough
- 1982 - Closure of GN&GE 'Joint Line' railway to March
- 2001 - The population of Spalding according to the census was 25,780
- 2002 - Main line railway locomotive named 'Spalding Town' in ceremony at the station
- 2004 - A New 860 MW gas-fired Spalding Power Station was opened in Spalding at West Marsh Road at a cost of £425 million
- 2004 - Springfields Outlet Centre opened in May
- 2008 - Tulip Radio was awarded a full-time broadcasting licence from Ofcom and it started broadcasting in early 2009 but closed in 2017
- 2009 - The Johnson Community Hospital, a Nurse Led Hospital was opened off Pinchbeck Road in the north of the town
- 2011 - The population of Spalding according to the census was 31,588
- 2016 - The first Spalding Festival is held. A community beer and music festival organised by Spalding Round Table that donates tens of thousands of pounds to good causes in the local Community.
- 2020 - Spalding Railway Station completed a major £2.5 million refit improving accessibility at the station by installing lifts. Its Grade II listed three storey main building also received an internal and external facelift
- 2021 - The population of Spalding, according to the government data, was estimated to be 36,737
- 2021 - Spalding’s Urgent Treatment Centre (UTC) was opened on the 1 April 2021, in the upgraded Johnson Community Hospital
- 2023 - Ayscoughfee Hall and gardens had a £375,000 upgrade by South Holland District Council
- 2023 - Spalding's Castle Sports Centre awarded £25 million from the Central Government Levelling Up fund

== Notable people ==
- Maurice Johnson (1688–1755), antiquary
- Bailey J Mills, drag performer
- Will Wand, rugby union player
- Nicola Willoughby, model, crowned Miss United Kingdom in 1999

== See also ==
- Tulip Festival
- 2016 Spalding shooting
