= List of natural gas-fired power stations in the United Kingdom =

As of 2023, there are 35 active gas fired combined cycle power plants and 14 simple cycle power plants operating in the United Kingdom, which have a total generating capacity of 35.7 GW.

== Decline of gas for power in the United Kingdom ==
In 2016, gas fired power stations generated a total of 127 TWh of electricity. This dropped to 72 TWh in 2024, with gas generating 26% of electricity that year in Great Britain. The government target is for this figure to fall to 5% by 2030, with the total generation from low carbon sources desired to exceed demand, enabling net exports.

The decline in gas-fired generation is largely due to the increase in renewable sources outweighing the decline of coal, and an overall reduction in demand.

=== Phase-out of coal in the United Kingdom ===
In November 2015, the UK Government announced that the country’s remaining fourteen coal-fired power stations would be closed by 2025. In November 2017, the UK Government co-founded the Powering Past Coal Alliance. In June 2021, the government said it would end coal power by October 2024.

The United Kingdom had continuously burned coal for the generation of electricity since the opening of Holborn Viaduct power station in 1882. On 21 April 2017, for the first time since 1882, the GB grid had a 24-hour period without any generation from coal power. In May 2019, the GB grid went its first full week without any coal power. In May 2020, in part due to record low electricity demand during the COVID-19 pandemic and strong renewable production, the GB grid beat the previous record and did not use coal generation for over a month.

By 2024, the use of coal power had decreased to historic lows not seen since before the Industrial Revolution. Coal supplied just 0.5% of GB electricity in 2024, down from 30% in 2014. UK electricity became entirely coal-free on 30 September 2024, with the final coal-fired power station shutting down permanently that day.

== List of active gas power stations ==
Name	Location	Owner	Date commissioned	Planned closure date	Total capacity (GW)	Notes	Image
Ballylumford C	Northern Ireland	EPUKi	2003		0.62		
Carrington	North West	ESB	2016		0.91		
Connahs Quay	Wales	Uniper	1996		1.38	Fuelled by sour gas	
Coolkeeragh	Northern Ireland	ESB	2004		0.41		
Corby	East Midlands	ESB	1994		0.41		
Coryton	East England	Intergen	2002		0.80		
Cottam Development Centre	East Midlands	Uniper	1998		0.45		
Damhead Creek	South East	Vitol	2000		0.81		
Didcot B	South East	RWE Generation UK	1998		1.45		
Enfield	London	Uniper	1999		0.41		
Grain CHP	South East	Uniper	2011		1.52		
Great Yarmouth	East England	RWE Generation UK	2001		0.42		
Keadby	Yorkshire and Humber	SSE plc	1994		0.74		
Killingholme B	East Midlands	Uniper	1993		0.60		
Langage	South West	EPUKi	2010		0.91		
Little Barford	East England	RWE Generation UK	1995		0.72		
Marchwood	South East	Marchwood Power (50% MEAG, 50% SSE plc)	2009		0.90		
Medway	South East	SSE plc	1995		0.76		
Pembroke B	Wales	RWE Generation UK	2012		2.20		
Peterhead	Scotland	SSE plc	2000		1.18		
Rocksavage	North West	Intergen	1998		0.81		
Rye House	East England	Vitol	1993		0.72		
Saltend	Yorkshire and Humber	Triton Power (50% Equinor, 50% SSE plc)	2000		1.20	Triton Power sold by Energy Capital Partners to Equinor and SSE in 2022	
Seabank	South West	Seabank Power (50% CK Infrastructure Holdings, 50% SSE plc)	2000		1.23		
Shoreham	South East	Vitol	2000		0.42		
South Humber Bank	Yorkshire and Humber	EPUKi	1997		1.37		
Spalding	East Midlands	Intergen	2004		0.95		
Staythorpe C	East Midlands	RWE Generation UK	2010		1.77	Built on the site of two former CEGB coal-fired power stations, the 360 MW Staythorpe A and B	
VPI Immingham	Yorkshire and Humber	Vitol	2004		1.25		
West Burton B	East Midlands	TotalEnergies	2013		1.33	Sold by EIG Global Energy Partners to TotalEnergies in 2024	

== See also ==
- List of power stations in England
- List of power stations in Northern Ireland
- List of power stations in Scotland
- List of power stations in Wales
- List of high-voltage transmission links in the United Kingdom
