= Greenhouse gas emissions by the United Kingdom =

Overview of the greenhouse gas emissions by United Kingdom

Development of carbon dioxide emissions, 1750 to 2023

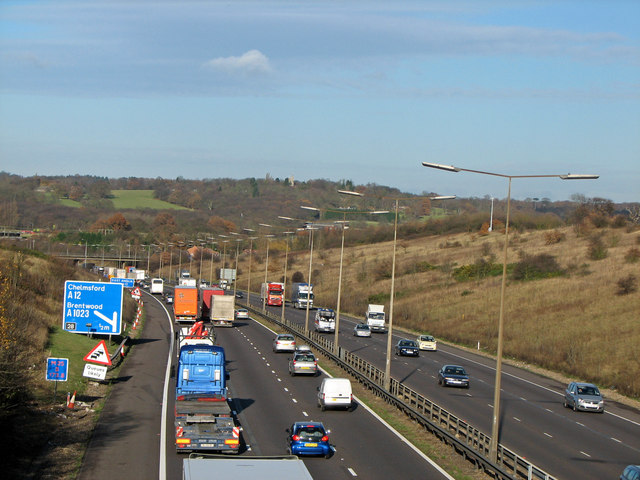
Transport is the largest source of greenhouse gas emissions.

In 2021, net greenhouse gas (GHG) emissions in the United Kingdom (UK) were 427 million tonnes (Mt) carbon dioxide equivalent (CO_{2}e), 80% of which was carbon dioxide (CO_{2}) itself. Emissions increased by 5% in 2021 with the easing of COVID-19 restrictions, primarily due to the extra road transport. The UK has over time emitted about 3% of the world total human-caused CO_{2}, with a current rate under 1%, although the population is less than 1%.

Emissions decreased in the 2010s due to the closure of almost all coal-fired power stations. In 2020 emissions per person were somewhat over 6 tonnes when measured by the international standard production based greenhouse gas inventory, near the global average. But consumption based emissions include GHG due to imports and aviation so are much larger, about 10 tonnes per person per year.

The UK has committed to net zero by 2050. The target for 2030 is a 68% reduction compared with 1990 levels. The UK has been successful in keeping its economic growth alongside taking climate change action. Since 1990, the UK's greenhouse gas emissions have been reduced by 50% while the economy has grown by around 79% up until 2022. One of the methods of reducing emissions is the UK Emissions Trading Scheme.

Meeting future carbon budgets will require reducing emissions by at least 3% a year. At the 2021 United Nations Climate Change Conference the Prime Minister said the government would not be "lagging on lagging", but in 2022 the opposition said Britain was badly behind in such home insulation. The Committee on Climate Change, an independent body which advises the UK and devolved government, has recommended hundreds of actions to the government, including better energy efficiency, such as in housing. In a 2024 report to parliament, the Climate Change Committee stated that only a third of the emissions reductions necessary to meet their 2030 target (68% of 1990 emission levels) were covered by credible plans.

== Monitoring, verification and reporting ==
Although carbon dioxide is the main GHG, methane (CH_{4}), nitrous oxide (N_{2}O), hydrofluorocarbons (HFC), Perfluorocarbons (PFC), Nitrogen trifluoride (NF_{3}) and Sulphur hexafluoride (SF_{6}) are included. Land use, land-use change, and forestry is the most uncertain sector.

== Cumulative emissions ==
Cumulative CO_{2} emissions since 1750 are estimated to be around 80 billion tonnes, about 3% of the world total. As well as coal burnt during and since the Industrial Revolution, destruction of forests also contributed.

== Emissions by sector ==
=== Transport ===
Transport is the most emitting sector, the Department for Energy Security and Net Zero estimated that it was responsible for about 26% of GHG in 2021. This is mainly due to road vehicles, and particularly cars, burning petrol and diesel, and has declined since 1990 despite the number of vehicles increasing, because of improvements in fuel efficiency in both petrol and diesel cars.

Transport was significantly impacted by COVID-19, as people were instructed to stay at home as much as possible. In 2020, territorial carbon dioxide emissions from the transport sector were 97.2 Mt, 19.6% (23.7 Mt) lower than in 2019, and 22.5% lower than in 1990. In 2020 transport accounted for 29.8% of all territorial carbon dioxide emissions, compared to 33.1% in 2019. The large majority of emissions from transport are from road transport.

Jet zero is the strategy to get to zero aviation emissions by 2050.

=== Energy supply ===
Energy in the United Kingdom emitted about a fifth of GHG in 2021, mainly by burning gas to generate electricity.

==== Gas ====
There were 50 enterprises in the United Kingdom oil and gas extraction industry with an annual turnover of more than five million pounds as of 2021. Extracting North Sea oil and gas is estimated to directly emit 3.5% of UK GHG. Environmental activists say there should be no new gas fired power stations in the UK.

==== Biomass ====
As of 2021 the net GhG and climate change effects of biomass fuel are still being researched and debated: one large user is Drax Power Station which aims to be carbon negative, but green groups dispute their carbon accounting and say that forests would not regrow quickly enough.

==== Coal ====
UK will phase-out coal in 2024. UK's Eggborough's plant was closed in 2018. The UK had two weeks in May 2019 with all its coal plants switched off for the first time since the Industrial Revolution began.

=== Business ===
Territorial carbon dioxide emissions from the business sector were estimated to be 59.4 Mt in 2020 and accounted for around 18.2% of all carbon dioxide emissions. There has been a 46.8% decrease in business sector emissions since 1990. Most of this decrease came between 2001 and 2009, with a significant drop in 2009 likely to have been driven by economic factors. The Humber industrial region is the UK's most emitting region, at 12 million tonnes of CO_{2} per year. The Confederation of British Industry said in 2025 that progress towards net zero was helping to level-up regions outside London and the south-east.

A 2020 study suggest half of UK's 'true carbon footprint' is created abroad, a large percentage of this can be attributed to imports entering the UK from other countries. International travel can also be included in this sector.

=== Residential ===
In 2021, the residential sector emitted almost 70 Mt CO2e, accounting for 16% of all GHG emissions. The main source of emissions in these sectors is the use of natural gas for heating (and for cooking in the case of the residential sector). Therefore the amount various by year depending on the weather. Emissions from these sectors do not include emissions from the generation of electricity consumed, as these emissions are included in the energy supply sector.

Governments have been criticised for support for home insulation being stop-start. At COP26 Boris Johnson said the UK would not be lagging on lagging but the government was later criticised as doing that.

=== Land use ===
==== Agriculture ====
Agriculture is responsible for a tenth of emissions.

- 68% of total nitrous oxide emissions
- 47% of total methane emissions
- 1.7% of total carbon dioxide emissions

==== Peat ====
UK peatlands such as the Great North Bog cover around 23,000 km2 or 9.5% of the UK land area and store at least 3.2 billion tonnes of carbon. A loss of only 5% of UK peatland carbon would equate to the total annual UK anthropogenic greenhouse gas emissions. Healthy peat bogs have a net long-term ‘cooling’ effect on the climate. Peatlands rely on water. When drained, peatlands waste away through oxidation, adding carbon dioxide to the atmosphere. Damaged and degraded peatlands place a substantial financial burden on society because of increased greenhouse gas emissions, poorer water quality and loss of other ecosystem services. The Wildlife Trusts say that selling peat should be banned.

==== Heath ====
Woody plant encroachment occurring in heathlands, can lead to the release of soil organic carbon, which is not offset by the growth in woody biomass above ground. The removal of conifers from afforested heathland is a recommended measure to reverse this trend.

=== Seas ===
MPs say that bottom trawling and dredging is harmful and should be banned in marine protected areas.

== Mitigation ==
=== UK carbon neutral plan ===
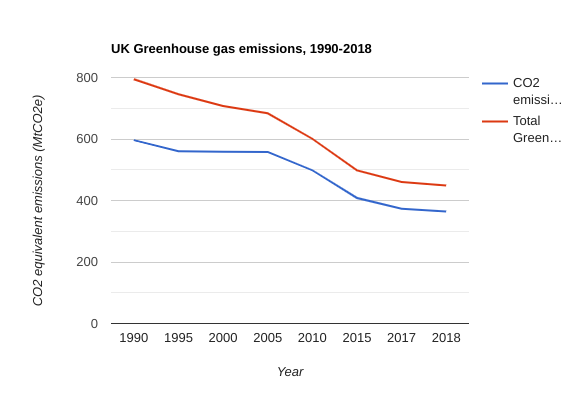
Graph of CO_{2} and total greenhouse gas emissions in the UK, 1990–2018, data from Department for Business, Energy and Industrial Strategy

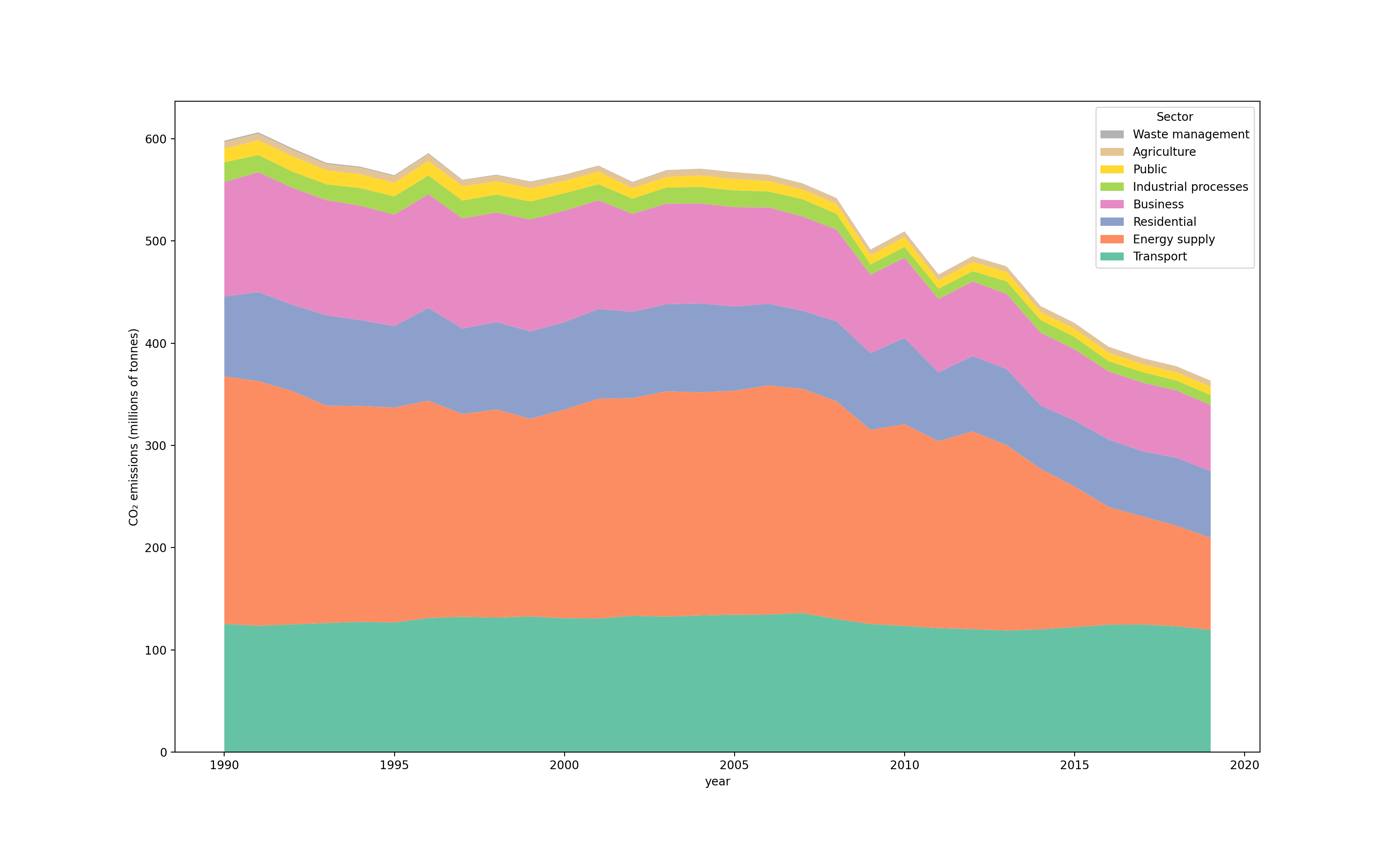
Graph of CO_{2} emissions by sector in the UK, 1990–2019 (Note: As of September 2020, published figures for 2019 are still provisional.)

The sectoral graph excludes carbon emissions from international aviation and international shipping, which together rose by 74.2% from 22.65 to 39.45 million tonnes of carbon dioxide between 1990 and 2004. Reductions in methane emissions are largely due to a decline in the country's coal industry and to improved landfilling technologies.

The Climate Change Act 2008 set the country's emission reduction targets.

Before 2019 the UK was legally bound by the Climate Change Act to reduce emissions 80% by 2050, but a new law mandating a 100% cut was under discussion in 2019. According to the Committee on Climate Change, the UK can cut its carbon emissions down to near zero and so become carbon neutral, at no extra cost if done gradually from 2019 to 2050. The law was adopted by the parliament in June 2019.

The "legally binding" targets are a reduction of at least 100% by 2050 (against the 1990 baseline).

It also mandates interim, 5-year budgets, which are:

| Carbon Budget | Carbon budget level | Reduction below 1990 levels |
|---|---|---|
| 1st (2008 to 2012) | 3,018 MtCO_{2}e | 25% |
| 2nd (2013 to 2017) | 2,782 MtCO_{2}e | 31% |
| 3rd (2018 to 2022) | 2,544 MtCO_{2}e | 37% by 2020 |
| 4th (2023 to 2027) | 1,950 MtCO_{2}e | 51% by 2025 |
| 5th (2028 to 2032) | 1,765 MtCO_{2}e | 57% by 2030 |
| 6th (2033 to 2037) | 965 MtCO_{2}e | 78% by 2035 |

=== Criticism of targets ===
Production targets have been criticised for ignoring the emissions embodied in imports, thereby attributing them to other countries, such as China. Including these gives a total for consumption based GHG emissions, also called the UK carbon footprint, of about 650 Mt a year.

=== Tax policy ===
Businesses and employees are given tax breaks for electric cars and a much larger proportion of business vehicle purchases are electric than those of consumers. But it is hoped increased supply of used fleet electric cars will eventually result in affordable second-hand electric cars for private buyers, as purchase price is still a barrier for many consumers. It has been suggested that value added tax (VAT) on natural gas used for heating should be raised from 5% to the usual 20% and the proceeds used to help poor people.

=== Emissions Trading ===
The UK Emissions Trading Scheme (UK ETS) is the carbon emission trading scheme of the United Kingdom. It is cap and trade and came into operation on 1 January 2021 following the UK's departure from the European Union. The cap is reduced in line with the UK's 2050 net zero commitment.

Carbon Price Support (CPS) is an additional tax, paid by electricity generation companies that use fossil fuels, introduced in 2013 in response to the low prices then on the European Union Emissions Trading System.

=== Transport ===
The Government is developing a plan to accelerate the decarbonisation of transport. The Transport Decarbonisation Plan (TDP) will set out in detail what government, business and society will need to do to deliver the significant emissions reduction needed across all modes of transport, putting us on a pathway to achieving carbon budgets and net zero emissions across every single mode of transport by 2050.

Sales of non-electric cars will end by 2030 and hybrids by 2035.

=== Residential ===
On the domestic level, the UK aims to reduce direct CO_{2} emissions from homes by 24% by 2030. There are several ways to achieve this goal, such as home insulation, the installation of heat pumps, and the use of renewable energy such as solar panels.

As of 2022 the installation cost of a heat pump is more than a gas boiler, but with the government grant and assuming electricity/gas costs remain similar their lifetime costs would be similar. However the share of heatpumps in the UK is far below the European average.

More waste heat could be saved and used - for example in London.

=== Agriculture ===
Since departure from the EU Common Agricultural Policy the Agriculture Bill was passed for agriculture in the United Kingdom.

The most common actions to reduce GHG emissions were recycling waste materials, improving nitrogen fertiliser application and improving energy efficiency. These are actions that are relevant to most farm enterprises. Those actions more suited to livestock enterprises had a lower level of uptake.

- The 2021 Farm Practices Survey (FPS) indicated that 67% of farmers thought it important to consider GHGs when making farm business decisions, whilst 27% considered it not important.

== See also ==
- Climate change in the United Kingdom
- Energy Company Obligation
