= Spalding Grammar School =

Boys' grammar school in Spalding, Lincolnshire, England

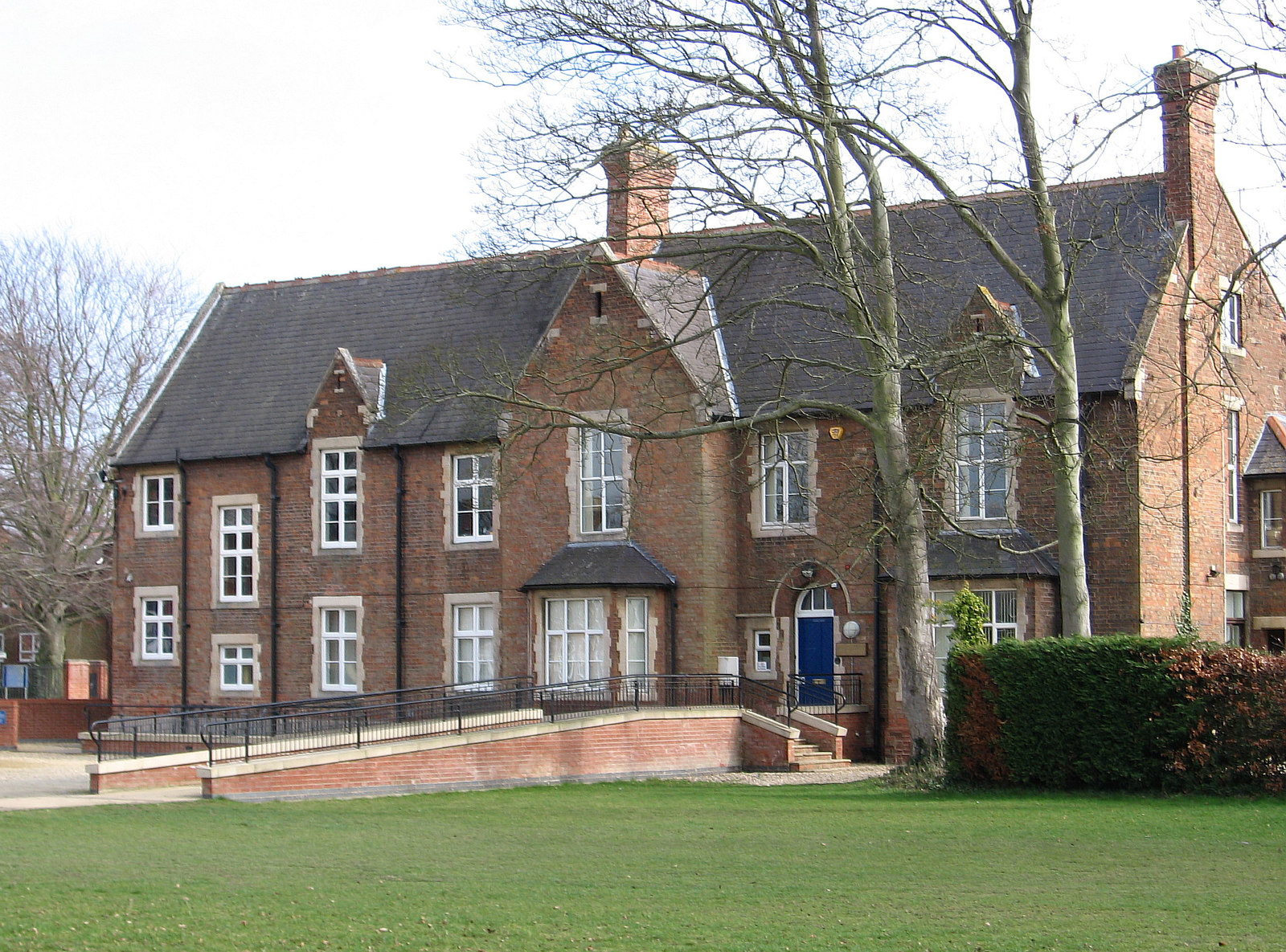
- School badge Spalding Grammar School

Location
- Priory Road; Spalding, Lincolnshire, PE11 2XH; England; 52°47′00″N 0°09′12″W

Information
- Other name: The Queen Elizabeth Royal Free Grammar School Spalding
- Type: 11–18 boys Grammar school; Academy
- Religious affiliation: Christian
- Established: 1588; 438 years ago
- Founders: John Blanche and John Gamlyn
- Department for Education URN: 139304 Tables
- Ofsted: Reports
- Chair of Governors: Craig Delaney
- Headteacher: Michele Anderson
- Staff: 68
- Gender: Boys (11-16) Mixed (16-18)
- Age: 11 to 18
- Enrolment: 999 (2024)
- Houses: Bentley, Gamlyn, Hobson, Wykeham, Moulton and Johnson
- Colour
- Publication: The Bentleian
- Website: Spalding Grammar School

Spalding Grammar School (SGS), fully known as The Queen Elizabeth Royal Free Grammar School Spalding, is an 11–18 boys' grammar school in Spalding, Lincolnshire, England. By November 2015, a total of 985 boys were enrolled at the school, 277 of which were enrolled on 16 to 19 study programmes.

== History ==
The school was founded in 1588 by royal charter, applied for by a Rev. Johnson, and within part of Spalding Parish Church, called St Thomas's Chapel, until the 19th century. It was founded on its current site in 1881.

The school amalgamated with Moulton Grammar School of Moulton in 1939. Moulton Grammar School was founded under the will of John Harrox (died 1561) who was steward to Sir John Harrington of Weston. The School opened in 1562 with ten pupils and continued to educate boys from the district until it amalgamated with Spalding. The old school buildings still exist but are now private residences. The school magazine, The Bentleian, dates to July 1922.

Anne, Princess Royal visited on the morning of Thursday 19 May 1988, and attended a service in the parish church, conducted by the Bishop of Lincoln, Bob Hardy, for the school's 400th anniversary; the school received its royal charter on 18 May 1588. Anne arrived by helicopter on the playing fields of Spalding High School at 10.50am.

In October 2018, a decision was made by the school to stop sixth form pupils from using "ever-larger bags" to carry books, which were seen by the school as an injury danger to younger pupils. A temporary online petition was organised against the order.

== Overview ==
=== Admissions ===
Spalding Grammar School admits pupils aged 11 to 18 from the council district of South Holland - an area of 500 square miles (1,300 km^{2}) - some pupils travelling over 20 miles (32 km) to reach the school.

In years 7 to 11, only boys are admitted. In sixth form (years 12 and 13), both boys and girls are admitted. Spalding Grammar is a selective school. "Admission is normally at age 11 and is offered to boys who achieve an agreed standard in two entrance tests taken during their final year at primary school." These tests are colloquially known as the 11+ tests " All but one of the grammar schools in the county administer common admission tests commissioned from the National Foundation for Educational Research. Sitting the test does not constitute an application to the school. The results are standardised by the NFER so that 25% of the Year 6 population living in the areas of Lincolnshire served by grammar schools attain an agreed aggregate score of 220 across both tests. This is known as “the county standard” and all pupils who attain this score qualify for a Lincolnshire grammar school place up to 31 August of Year 7; after that date boys will need to sit a ‘Late Entry’ test"

"By law, the Governors must consider parents who have named the school using the common application form, or who have applied online, before any other parents.

Places at Spalding Grammar School are offered to pupils who have attained the county standard irrespective of race, disability or social background. In accordance with the School Admissions Code, all children whose statement of Special Educational Needs names the school will be admitted; the allocation of school places for those pupils will take place before the school allocates other places as part of the normal admissions process. Only boys may be admitted below the sixth form." The current number of pupils is 999. The sixth form has 256 pupils. There are 68 teaching staff.

=== School site ===
The school is in the south of Lincolnshire, on Priory Road in Spalding.

A sports hall was opened by boxer Henry Cooper in November 1993. In January 2006 new buildings were opened for ICT, sociology, technology, English and drama (with a performing arts studio). The Modern Languages lab was also built at the same time as the new buildings were opened. In late 2009, a new Business Studies block, new staff room and atrium were also built.

=== Subjects offered years 7-11 ===
Spalding grammar offers a variety of subjects with compulsory: Mathematics, MFL, Sport, combined or triple sciences depending on student performance, English Literature and English Language for years 7-11.

History, A Modern Foreign Language(e.g Spanish), art, music, religious studies (RS), geography, computer science (ICT), combined science and design technology (DT) are taken until a student reaches year 9; at which time they must choose 3 of the following to reduce the number of subjects taken at GCSE choosing from: art, business, ICT, Design, engineering, PE, geography, history, music, RS, and occasionally others if interest is high enough e.g: classical civilisations. Students that have shown themselves to be capable are given the ability to do triple award science (biology,chemistry,physics).

== Awards and recognition ==
In 2024 and 2015 the school received an Ofsted rating of Grade 2 "Good", following a previous rating of a Grade 1 "Outstanding" in 2011, and "Good" in 2007. The school converted to academy status on 1 February 2013.

In 2006, the school was granted Specialist Status as a Languages and Engineering College. It became the first school in Lincolnshire to gain joint specialist status in these subjects. Accompanying the specialist status was building work to improve general aspects of the school, and to provide a Language Lab and Engineering Lab for the teaching of the subjects. The school converted to academy status on 1 February 2013.

== Headteachers ==
- Richard Bentley until 1682
- 1883, Rev Oliver Inskip, father of Major-General Tim Inskip
- February 1887, Rev Thomasin Albert Stoodley, aged 40, former headmaster from 1880 of Hereford Grammar School, on Thursday 11 October 1894, at St Martin-in-the-Fields in London, he married Mary Melesina Chenevix Trench (1848 – 29 November 1912), her uncle was Richard Chenevix Trench; he became the vicar of Folkingham, then for Dowsby from 1898; he died aged 69 on 27 February 1915.
- November 1894, Rev Edward Martin Tweed, aged 26, he attended the Perse School and St Catharine's College, Cambridge; he became the vicar of Burton Coggles; he drowned in the pond in Burton Coggles on 25 October 1939, aged 71, which was thought to be suicide, connected to the recent outbreak of the Second World War, and that his wife had been ill; his wife, Edith, died in Tinwell, Rutland, aged 76 in October 1940.
- May 1909, Mr Ernest Charles Chappell, he attended Barnsley Grammar School, and died in Bakewell, aged 93 in early December 1965
- 1920, Louis Joseph Driver, aged 35, he joined in 1907 teaching Maths and French, from a school at Bowes Park; he was paid £600 a year he died in the Johnson Hospital aged 79 on 24 February 1965; his wife was the headmistress of the girls' high school, Miss Jeanne Ouseley, who he married in December 1952; his sister Anne Driver MBE was a broadcaster with BBC School Radio, so his brother-in-law was the writer Trevor Blakemore
- September 1952, Stanley Wyndham Woodward, aged 41, former headmaster, from 1947, of Wem Grammar School, Shropshire, he was educated at Tonbridge School from 1925–30 and studied Classics and Modern Languages at Sidney Sussex College, Cambridge, from 1936 to 1947, and had taught at Bishop Stortford College, and had served as a Lieutenant Colonel in the Intelligence Corps in the war, in North Africa, Italy, France, Belgium and Germany; he was married with daughters Susan and Clare, and son Stephen; his wife, Iris Woodward ran youth clubs in East Hertfordshire during the war, and had a degree in Fine Art from Durham University; at a local meeting, in January 1959, Mr Woodward said that 'equal opportunity should not be confused with equality in intelligence. We were not allowed to be equal in intelligence, and it was stupid to think we were'; the local MP Sir Herbert Butcher thought that the local secondary modern schools would be giving greater competition to the grammar schools, over time, as the grammar schools had done to public schools; he left in July 1972; he died aged 90 in June 2002 at Saffron Walden Community Hospital
- September 1972, John Skidmore Fordham, aged 41, educated at Bishop Gore Grammar School in Swansea, with a degree in Botany, and was a Methodist preacher, married with five children, he had moved from Yeovil Grammar School, being briefly the headmaster; his wife Margaret taught at Pinchbeck East Primary School; he resigned on 20 November 1986, aged 55; his son is Sir Michael Fordham (judge) (born 1964)
- September 1987, Michael John Stewart (aged 42), deputy head of Oakwood Park Grammar School in Kent for four years, he attended Emanuel School in Wandsworth, and studied Russian and German at Durham University, and was married with a son and daughter

== Notable alumni ==
- Maurice Johnson (antiquary) (c.1700–5)
- William Hobson Mills, organic chemist who investigated stereochemistry and found the Mills-Nixon effect
- Harrison Burrows, professional footballer for Sheffield United
- Mapalo Mwansa NFL player for Carolina Panthers
- Will Wand, professional rugby player for Leicester Tigers
- Stuart Storey, British sports commentator and former 110m hurdler
- John W. Skinner, headteacher and author
- Tre Jean-Marie, Grammy nominated songwriter and producer

== See also ==
- Spalding High School - Selective all-girls school, but accepts boys into their sixth form.
