= Maurice Johnson (antiquary) =

Founder of 'The Gentlemen's Society'

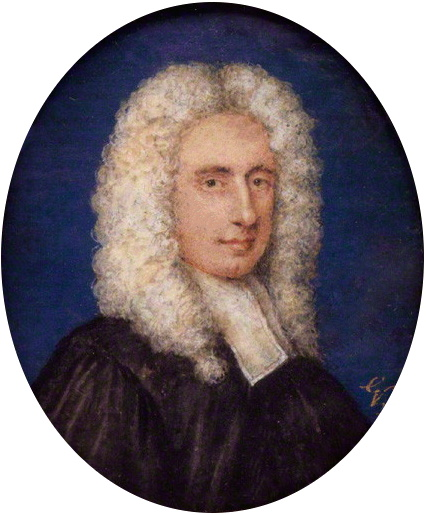
Portrait by George Vertue

Maurice Johnson (1688–1755), of Spalding, Lincolnshire, was the founder of 'The Gentlemen's Society' (now known as Spalding Gentlemen's Society).

Johnson was educated at Spalding Grammar School. He studied law.

In 1717 he assisted in the re-establishment of the Society of Antiquitaries (Society of Antiquaries of London). He invited William Stukeley to join the society. Johnson later formed 'The Stamford Society', basing this on the earlier society at Spalding.
