= Spalding High School, Lincolnshire =

Grammar school in Spalding, Lincolnshire, England

Spalding High School

Location
- Stonegate; Spalding, Lincolnshire, PE11 2PJ; England; 52°46′59″N 0°08′35″W

Information
- Type: Community grammar school
- Motto: Lampada Vitae Tradimus; Hand on the Lamp of Life
- Established: 1920
- Local authority: Lincolnshire
- Department for Education URN: 120642 Tables
- Ofsted: Reports
- Chair: P Gorton
- Head teacher: M K Anderson
- Gender: Girls
- Age: 11 to 18
- Enrolment: 972
- Website: http://www.spaldinghigh.lincs.sch.uk

Spalding High School (SHS) is a grammar school for girls and a mixed sixth form located in Spalding, Lincolnshire, England.

== Location and admissions ==
Spalding High School, situated on Stonegate, Spalding, halfway between the Welland (and B1173) and the Coronation Channel to the east. The rear of the school, to the east, backs onto Exeter Drain and the Spalding Academy playing fields. The school also accepts some girls from Cambridgeshire, Peterborough and Norfolk.

SHS admits pupils aged 11–18, who in the lower school are expected to pass an 11+ exam. There are approximately 1,000 staff and students at the school. The headmistress is Michele Anderson.

== History ==
The school opened on 22 January 1920, originally at Ayscoughfee Hall School, then moved to its current site in the late 1950s. There are a number of watercolours of the original site in the school's collection, as well as all full school photos (taken once every five years) dating back to the school's early days. The library keeps an archive of photos, programmes and other memorabilia.

A Guide unit was founded in 1925, the 4th Spalding group. In December 1931 Lady Hoskyns gave out the prizes; she attended the same Cambridge college as the headmistress. The speech day on 15 February 1938 was given by Prof Charles Melville Attlee (1894–1971) of University College Nottingham.

Sir John Gleed was the chairman of the governors until 1943. There were 265 at the school in the 1940s, with only 14 in the sixth form.

Due to lack of room, some girls chose to travel to Wisbech High School in preference. On 27 January 1944, Holland Education Committee purchased 8.5 acres for a new school. Planning permission was given by 1948. In 1948 a Biology laboratory and two classrooms were built on netball courts. In the early 1950s around one in a hundred women went to university.

By 1953, there were 410 at the school, with 56 in the sixth form. The 'Daily Mirror' and 'Daily Herald' visited the school in 1953 to look at the cramped buildings. The minister of education announced that four classrooms would be built on the boys grammar school playing fields, for the girls' school. But a new school could not be built until 1958. The new classrooms opened in 1955 as the 'Medway Rooms'.

=== Dual site ===
In February 1957 the new school foundations were started. The building was to be completed by September 1958, but it would take until January 1959. The school wanted a separate gym, but Sir Oswald Giles of the county council wanted the school hall to be the gym. The new school opened Thursday 8 January 1959. Biology, Chemistry and Physics were taught in separate laboratories. The new school was officially opened Friday 20 March 1959 by Sir Herbert Butcher, with chairman of Holland Education Committee. But the school was now a two-site school. By 1960 there were 500 at the school, with 80 in the sixth form. The swimming pool was built in 1967.

21 year old trainee classics teacher Miss Jennifer Jane Stearman, of 21 Redfearn Close in Cambridge, who taught with Mr Les Churchill, was killed in a vehicle collision, in a Morris 1000, with a truck on the evening of Sunday 18 February 1973, at the southern end of the A1073 Crowland bypass. She was visiting her grandmother in March, Cambridgeshire, and was taken to Peterborough Hospital. The bypass had opened in 1972, and this was the first death.

=== Single site ===
By 1980 the sixth form was 160. A new £1.3m block would open in 1985, with construction starting in May 1984, which would allow all teaching to take place on one site from January 1986.

It was officially opened in March 1986 by Frances Manners, Duchess of Rutland; her mother featured in the 2021 A Very British Scandal; the Duchess was pleased that Lincolnshire retained grammar schools, saying 'freedom of choice is the sign of a free society'. By 1989 there were 710 at the school.

The £559,000 technology centre was officially opened on Thursday 14 October 1993 by Prof Richard Kimbell, of Goldsmiths College. Construction had started in April 1992, and it opened in January 1993. A new six-classroom £409,000 Languages block was approved by Lincolnshire County Council in May 1994, to start construction in December 1994. The school now had 900 girls, often travelling from Peterborough.

The new Languages block was opened in February 1996 by the leader of Lincolnshire County Council, although had been open since September 1995.

=== Sport ===
In the 1960s and 1970s, the school's playing field was frequently used for national and regional schools' hockey competitions. It achieved sports college status in 2003.

On 28 April 1983, 13 year old Melanie Hampson had a serious javelin accident, and was taken to the Pilgrim Hospital.

In July 1992, the school gymnastics team represented the UK in the European Schools Games in France.

== Houses ==
In a typical year group at SHS there are five forms of approximately 30 pupils. Each form is a member of a house. There are five houses, each named after famous women of historic importance:

- Curie - after Marie Curie (physicist)
- Johnson - after Amy Johnson (aviator)
- Nightingale - after Florence Nightingale (medicine)
- Pankhurst - after Emmeline Pankhurst (women's rights)
- Sharman - after Helen Sharman (astronaut)

== Headteachers ==
- 1920 - Miss Ethel Strachan Henry, from Putney; from 1926 she was the headmistress of Boston High School for twenty years, seeing the Boston girls' school move to the current site in 1939; she died on 15 August 1959.
- 1926 - Miss Marjory Chambers, she attended Lincoln Girls' High School and Cheltenham Ladies College and Newnham College Cambridge, and previously taught at Wallasey High School; later she was the first headmistress from 1931 to 1944 of Wirral County School for Girls in Lower Bebington; she died on 17 February 1950 in Tunstall
- September 1931 - Miss Elizabeth Curry, she had been the headmistress at Trowbridge County High School for Girls in Wiltshire since 1929, and attended Newnham College Cambridge; later she became headmistress of Aigburth Vale High School for Girls from April 1937 until 1959
- April 1937 - Miss Marjorie Ralph, she came from Roedean as a Maths teacher, she also taught from 1927 to 1933 at Queen Mary High School on Long Lane in Fazakerley (it closed in 1985); on 27 May 1938 she had a head-on collision on the Great North Road in Long Bennington, having passed her driving test in October 1937, and was fined £2 at Spitalgate police court in June 1938
- September 1945 - Miss Jeanne Ouseley, she attended Newnham College Cambridge from 1928 to 1931, and had been a history teacher in West London; she had arrived in Spalding on VJ Day; in December 1952, she married Mr Driver, the former headmaster of the boys' grammar school; her husband's sister was Anne Driver MBE, the pianist of BBC Radio's Listen with Mother; Jennie Driver died in December 1997
- September 1970 - Miss Dora Leonard, the former headmistress of Wisbech High School from 1953, she had attended Westfield College, she had been a teacher for 37 years when she left in 1976, and moved to live in Aldborough, Norfolk; she did not believe in the comprehensive system, as there had never been difficulty in transferring girls to the school, when it was required; she died in September 2003 aged 87
- January 1977 - Miss Margaret Ivy McClure, she attended Trinity College Dublin, and taught Maths for five years at Glenlola Collegiate School in Northern Ireland, and was the deputy head of Broughton High School in Salford; on 9 February 1987 a 49 year old parent, from Moulton, was arrested after assaulting her and deputy head Mrs Margaret Ford but at Lincoln Court in July 1987, the judge believed that it was not a sufficiently criminal assault, and he was fined £100
- September 1991 - Mrs Marguerite Swallow, she had replaced Margaret Ford as deputy head, in January 1988, and was head for two terms, with Jenny Morton as deputy head
- April 1992 - John Williams, former headteacher of the Middlecott School in Kirton where he changed the school name in 1987, and was originally from Crewe, since January 1986 when aged 43; he was previously the deputy head of Bourne Grammar School, when living in Sleaford, and he had been head of history at Carre's Grammar School in Sleaford; his wife taught at Kesteven and Sleaford High School, and his Lincolnshire-educated son Andrew Williams (novelist) was a producer of BBC2 Newsnight, later on Panorama, and later creating the six-part BBC documentary series World War II Behind Closed Doors: Stalin, the Nazis and the West in 2008 He died in March 2026.

== Notable former pupils ==
- Emma Rayner (née Hill), born 1964, who married BBC East Midlands Today presenter Quentin Rayner (a twin) in June 1992 at St Mary's Church, Pinchbeck, with her honeymoon in the Cayman Islands, daughter of Lutton and Pinchbeck vicar, Rev David Hill, she gained a degree in the History of Art from UEA in 1985, then studied radio journalism at Lancashire Polytechnic; worked as a reporter for Radio Lincolnshire in the late 1980s then Radio Nottingham, where she met her husband, and worked on the new East Midlands Today in 1991 as a reporter, 6 O-levels in 1980, English, French and Art A-levels in 1982; her sisters Zoe (Visual Arts UEA in 1992) and Candida left the school in 1988 and 1990
- Christine Russell (1956–63) - Labour MP 1997-2010 for City of Chester, who unseated Gyles Brandreth in 1997.
- Laela Pakpour-Tabrizi (1993–2000), trustee of British Library.

== Notable former teachers ==
- Valerie Belton (3 July 1925 - 3 November 2011), she arrived from teaching at Bromley High School, was Head of History from 1953 until 1962 where she ran the Spalding High School Historical Society, and took an interest in Hungarian refugees in 1956; she became deputy head of West Bridgford Grammar School, and lastly headmistress of Edgbaston High School from 1967 to 1987; she was originally from west Norfolk, and attended Cheltenham Ladies College and studied history at St Hilda's College, Oxford, and later retired to Ingworth in Norfolk
- Jenny Randerson, Baroness Randerson (1972-4 history) - Life peer, former education spokesperson for LibDems in the Welsh Assembly.

== See also ==
- Spalding Grammar School - a school for boys, but accepts girls into the sixth form.
