= John W. Skinner =

British headmaster

John William Skinner (26 November 1890 - 1 April 1955) was headmaster of Culford School, near Bury St Edmunds, Suffolk, England between 1924 and 1951.

He attended Spalding Grammar School in Lincolnshire.

== Author ==
He was the author of several books and pamphlets, including:

- Skinner, John W. (1936). Youth on Fire. Epworth Press.
- Skinner, John W. (1943). Youth Takes the Helm. Epworth Press. Archived from the original on 25 June 2004. (Originally School Chapel addresses from Culford School. Questions what the world would be like in 1999).
- Skinner, John W. (1949). School Stresses: The Grammar School Today and Tomorrow. Epworth Press.
- Skinner, John W. (1955). Rational French Course. Harrap. ISBN 978-0-245-57392-7.
