= Great North Bog =

Peatland restoration initiative in England

The Great North Bog is a large restoration initiative covering over 90% of the upland peatland in the North of England. It is a £200m project and aims to restore nearly 7,000 square kilometres of upland over 20 years. It is a partnership between the North Pennines Area of Outstanding Natural Beauty Partnership, Yorkshire Peat Partnership and the Moors for the Future Partnership. The area covers five national parks — the Peak District, Yorkshire Dales, North York Moors, Lake District and Northumberland.

== Ecosystem recovery ==
Some of the peat is 8000 years old, and it is thought that about half the peatland needs restoring, by work in the winter. Much of these blanket bogs had been drained to graze sheep, this draining was subsidized in the 1950s and 1960s, and raise grouse for shooting. The land is currently managed by sheep farmers and landowners, and is thought to be losing peat depth at 2.5 cm a year while regrowing at 1 cm per year.

== Flood control ==
Peat is now being washed away down deep channels and during storms the town of Otley is often flooded via the River Wharfe. Studies indicate that restoring part of the peatland with stone, wood or coir dams greatly slowed peak water flow.

== Carbon capture ==
The peatlands currently store 400 million tonnes of carbon. The project say that damaged peat in the area releases 3.7 million tonnes of carbon annually, about 1% of UK greenhouse gas emissions. The programme includes a restoration and conservation plan which will make a significant contribution to the UK’s carbon sequestration targets.
