= Will Wand =

English rugby union player (born 2001)

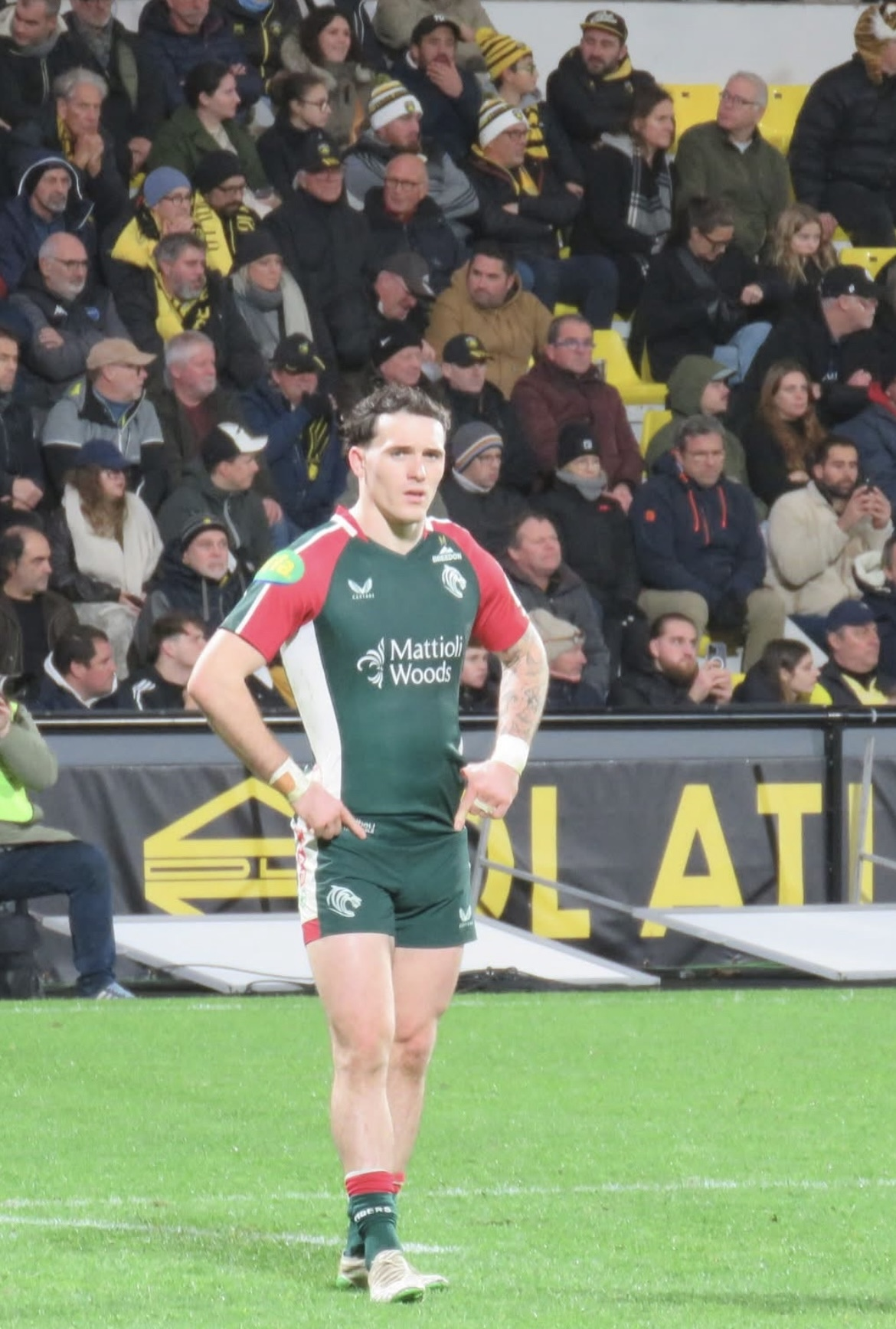
- Wand playing for Leicester against La Rochelle
- Born: William George Wand; 31 December 2001 (age 24) Spalding, England
- Height: 6 ft 2 in (188 cm)
- Weight: 98 kg (216 lb)
- School: Spalding Grammar School; Brooksby Melton College

Rugby union career
- Position: Centre/wing
- Current team: Leicester Tigers
Senior career
Years	Team	Apps	(Points)
2021-2022	Cambridge	20	(36)
2022–2024	Coventry	42	(85)
2024–	Leicester Tigers	47	(105)
- Correct as of 7 November 2026

William George Wand (born 31 December 2001) is an English professional rugby union player for Leicester Tigers in Premiership Rugby. His usual positions are centre and wing.

== Early life ==
Wand was born and raised in Spalding, Lincolnshire. He also attended Spalding Grammar School. After leaving school, he joined Brooksby Melton College. Wand played his club rugby at Spalding RFC where he progressed through all the age ranks.

After leaving college, Wand laboured for a sandblasting company alongside playing for Cambridge.

== International career ==
On 30 January 2026, Wand was named in the 26 man England ‘A’ squad in preparation to play Ireland ‘A’ at Thomond Park.

On 2 November 2026, he was named in the England ‘A’ squad to play Argentina ‘A’ in Bath at the Rec.

== Career ==
=== Cambridge ===
Wand made his debut for Cambridge in September 2021, after signing for the club a month prior, in a National League 1 match against Rams RFC at 19 years old.

On 11 December 2021, Wand earned his first start of the season in his favoured position of outside centre and was named man of the match after scoring two tries against league leaders Rosslyn Park and received National 1 player of the week shortly after.

He finished the 2021–22 season with 20 appearances and 7 tries.

=== Coventry ===
After an impressive debut senior season in National League 1, Wand earned a move to Championship club Coventry ahead of the 2022–23 season.

On 9 September 2022, Wand made his Championship debut for Coventry at home against Bedford Blues.

He scored his first try for Coventry against Nottingham at Lady Bay on Boxing Day 2022.

He finished the 2022–23 season with 19 appearances and 3 tries.

2023-2024

It was announced that Wand had re-signed with Coventry ahead of the 2023–24 season.

On 8 September 2023, Wand was named man of the match in Coventry's first game of the season after scoring against Saracens in the newly formed Premiership Rugby Cup competition. Coventry won the game 28–14.

Wand started the week after when Coventry played Harlequins at The Stoop that finished in a 21–21 draw. The following week Coventry played Gloucester at Kingsholm Stadium. Wand scored a try that levelled the game, but Gloucester scored a 79th-minute winner that finished the game 32–31.

Wand won the Championship's Player of the Month award for September 2023 after outstanding performances in the Premiership Rugby Cup. He scored 2 tries in 4 appearances.

On 23 March 2024, Wand equalled a Coventry club record against Hartpury after scoring 4 tries in a league match.

Wand claimed Coventry's 2023/24 Players’ Player award after he finished the season with 23 appearances, 22 of which came as part of the starting line-up, and scored 14 tries altogether.

Wand was named in the 2023/24 Championship ‘Team of the Season’.

=== Leicester Tigers ===
On 21 June 2024, Leicester Tigers announced the signing of Wand for the 2024–25 season.

Wand made his Premiership debut on 5 October 2024 at Kingston Park against Newcastle Falcons and scored an intercept try with his first touch of the ball.

Wand featured a total of 11 appearances in the 2024–25 season. 6 appearances were in the Premiership & 5 in the Premiership Cup. He scored 7 tries altogether including 3 against his former club Coventry, 1 in the home fixture and 2 in the away fixture.

2025-26

Wand started the first game of the Premiership season against Bristol Bears at Ashton Gate.

On 4 October 2025, Wand scored 2 tries, as a substitute at 45 minutes, in the first home game of the 2025–26 season against Harlequins to secure a 19–0 comeback. Leicester won the game 29–19 in a famous win.

Wand made his European Champions Cup debut with a start in the 13 jersey against La Rochelle at the Stade Marcel Deflandre. He scored a last minute try but Leicester ended up losing the game 39–20.

Wand was named in the European Champions Cup ‘Team of the Week’ for his performance against the Stormers at the DHL Stadium in Cape Town.

Wand started in the Prem Cup final against Exeter Chiefs at Welford Road. He scored 2 tries contributing to a memorable 66–14 win in front of the home crowd.

On 29 March 2026, Wand was named player of the match, against Gloucester hosted at Villa Park stadium, after scoring a try within 2 minutes and putting in a dominant defensive and attacking performance.

Wand won the PREM Rugby ‘Player of the Month’ award for March 2026.

On 17th May 2026, Wand won player of the match against Sale Sharks at CorpArc stadium after a dominant performance. He was noted for his defensive work rate and ability to beat defenders after scoring a chip and chase try. It was the first time Leicester had won away to Sale since 2018.

Wand won the PREM Rugby ‘Player of the Month’ award for May 2026. The first player to win twice in one season since George Ford in 2020.

== Personal life ==
Wand has a younger brother, Tom, who played in the Leicester Tigers academy as a loosehead prop. As of the beginning of the 2024–25 season, he signed for National 2 North team Sheffield Tigers.

== Career statistics ==
Club	Season	Competition	Appearances	Tries	Total Points
Cambridge	2021-22	National League 1	20	7	35
Coventry	2022-23	Championship	14	2	10
Coventry	2022-23	Championship Cup	5	1	5
Coventry	2023-24	Premiership Rugby Cup	4	1	10
Coventry	2023-24	Championship	19	12	60
Leicester	2024-25	Premiership	6	1	5
Leicester	2024-25	Premiership Rugby Cup	5	6	30
Leicester	2025-26	Premiership	16	4	20
Leicester	2025-26	Premiership Rugby Cup	8	7	35
Leicester	2025-26	European Rugby Champions Cup	5	2	10
Leicester	2026-27	Premiership Rugby Cup	3	1	5
Leicester	2026-27	Premiership	4		
Leicester	2026-27	European Rugby Champions Cup	1		
