= Springfields Designer Outlet & Leisure =

Springfields

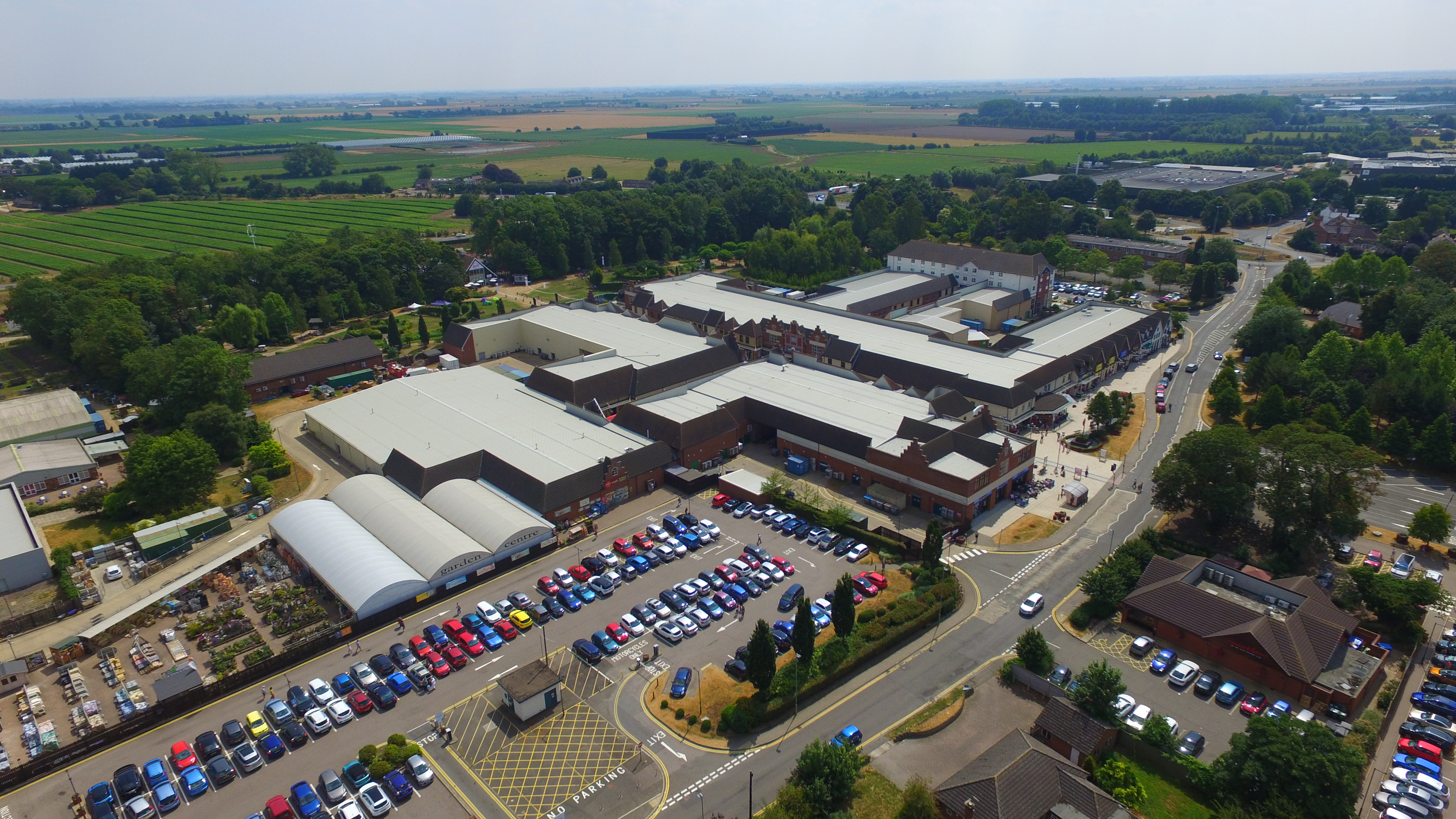
- An aerial view of Springfields in 2018
- Location: Spalding, Lincolnshire, England
- Coordinates: 52.79920°N 0.12755°W
- Address: Springfields Designer Outlet, Camelgate, Spalding PE12 6EU
- Opened: 1 May 2004
- Previous names: Springfields Outlet Shopping & Leisure
- Developer: Thornfield Properties
- Manager: SLR Outlets Limited
- Owner: UBS Triton Property Fund
- Num. of stores: 55
- Floor area: 200,000 sq ft
- Parking: 1,400 spaces
- Public transit: Spalding; 37, 301, 505 and B3X bus routes
- Website: Official Website

Springfields Designer Outlet & Leisure is a major outlet centre with gardens in Spalding, Lincolnshire.

== Stores ==
As of 2024, the mall had 55 stores across its 45 acre site. Outlet brands at Springfields include Marks & Spencer, Skechers, Next Outlet, Levi's, Jack Wills and Clarks. Places to eat include Costa Coffee and The Parlour, an Edwardian formal-style restaurant operated by Blue Diamond.

== Garden History ==
During the 1920s, millions of visitors came by train, coach and car to tour the special tulip routes in the Spalding area, which has established itself as the centre of the British flower bulb industry. As such in 1959, over 200,000 people attended the first Spalding Tulip Parade.

Springfields Festival Gardens were opened to the public in 1966 for the first time. A charity organisation, Springfields Horticultural Society, was formed to manage the gardens which raised public awareness about the growing and cultivation of flowers from bulbs, and the broader social benefits of horticulture and gardening as a means of relaxation and enjoyment.

After decades of popularity, public interest in the Gardens began to wane, and maintenance of the gardens became difficult to sustain, even for the short 8-week spring flower season.

In the early 2000s, several ideas were considered for funding new investment into the gardens, and eventually a plan was agreed upon with development partner Thornfield Properties, seeing the first Outlet Village in Lincolnshire being approved.

Springfields Festival Gardens became a Royal Horticultural Society (RHS) partner garden in 2025.

== Outlet History ==
The shopping outlet opened on 1st May 2004, marked with a visit by Anne, Princess Royal , who planted a tree within the Festival Gardens, following in the footsteps of the Queen Elizabeth, The Queen Mother who planted a tree several decades earlier. A Phase 2 extension (South Avenue) was built in 2008, adding more stores and a Travelodge hotel.

In 2018, further investment was made with the addition of Adventure Land, home to 10 attractions including the largest JCB Young Drivers Zone in the UK.. This area of Springfields closed in 2026.

Planning permission has been fully consented for a 50,000 sq ft 'Phase 3' retail extension that will add approximately 15 new stores and restaurants. The developer reports this will create up to 350 new jobs for Spalding. The proposal was approved by South Holland District Council in 2020, however has been delayed several times and has not yet come to fruition.

== Location and transport links ==
Springfields is located in Spalding, at the junction of the A16 and A151. The nearest rail connection is Spalding railway station, around 20 minutes from Peterborough. Multiple bus links service the centre including the 37, 301, 505 and B3X.

== Events ==
Springfields hosts events throughout the year, including an annual 'Fireworks & Music Spectacular' with a new theme each year, held around Bonfire Night.

The Festival Gardens hosts an illuminated light trail, known as the Winter Wonderland Walk, throughout November and December.
