= Flaxborough =

Fictional town in Lincolnshire, England

Flaxborough is a fictitious town in Lincolnshire, created by author and local journalist Colin Watson as the background for a series of comical detective novels (The Flaxborough Chronicles) featuring Detective Inspector Walter Purbright.

Flaxborough cannot be precisely identified with any real town from the texts. It is a borough, with a borough police force and Chief Constable, a yacht club, and docks. It is often identified with Boston. But it also had a cathedral, suggesting identification with Lincoln itself - although Lincoln, or rather Lincoln Jail, is explicitly mentioned too. The descriptions of the townscape, and in particular Lucilla Teatime's antiques business or charity offices, most closely resemble Louth.

In the BBC television adaptation Murder Most English, most locations were filmed in Spalding.

== The Flaxborough Chronicles ==
- Coffin, Scarcely Used (1958)
- Bump in the Night (1960)
- Hopjoy Was Here (1962)
- Lonelyheart 4122 (1967)
- Charity Ends at Home (1968)
- The Flaxborough Crab (1969) - U.S: Just What the Doctor Ordered
- Broomsticks over Flaxborough (1972) - U.S: Kissing Covens
- The Naked Nuns (1975) - U.S: Six Nuns and a Shotgun
- One Man's Meat (1977) - U.S: It Shouldn't Happen to a Dog
- Blue Murder (1979)
- Plaster Sinners (1980)
- Whatever's Been Going on at Mumblesby? (1982)

== TV Adaptation ==
Four of the books were adapted for television in 1977, and starred Anton Rodgers as Detective Inspector Purbright and Christopher Timothy as his Detective Sergeant, Sydney Love. The four books adapted were Hopjoy Was Here, Lonelyheart 4122, The Flaxborough Crab and Coffin, Scarcely Used. The series was dramatised by Richard Harris, produced by Martin Lisemore and directed by Ronald Wilson.
