= Coryton Power Station =

Power station in the UK

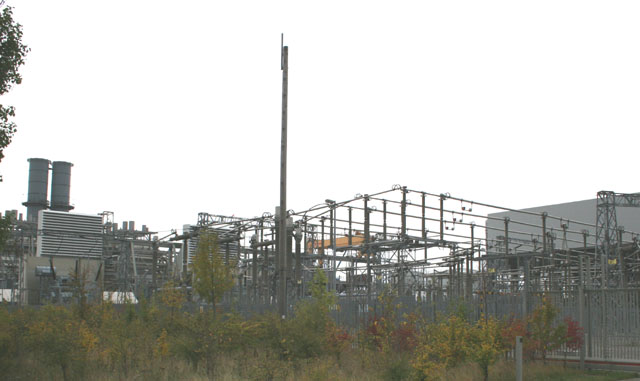
- Country: England, United Kingdom
- Location: East of England, Essex
- Coordinates: 51°30′43″N 0°30′29″E
- Status: Operational as per UK capacity market
- Construction began: 2000
- Commission date: 2002
- Construction cost: £470 million (£0.64m/MW)
- Owner: Creditas
- Operator: Coryton Energy Ltd

Thermal power station
- Primary fuel: Natural gas
- Turbine technology: Combine Cycle Gas Turbine
- Site area: 5.2 hectare
- Chimneys: 2 (55 metres)
- Cooling towers: Air Cooled Heat Exchanger
- Cooling source: Air Cooling
- Combined cycle?: Yes

Power generation
- Units operational: 2
- Make and model: Alstom GT26 A/B
- Nameplate capacity: 732 MW

External links
- Commons: Related media on Commons

Coryton Power Station is a 732 MW Combined Cycle Gas Turbine (CCGT) gas-fired power station at Coryton, Thurrock, Essex, UK.

== History ==
The site was part of the Coryton Refinery before its closure in 2012. Owned by InterGen, Coryton Power Station was built by Bechtel between 2000 and 2002, and cost £470 million. It was commissioned in 2002 and is run by Coryton Energy Ltd.

The InterGen is owned by Sev.en Global Investments.

== Specification ==
It is a CCGT type power station that uses natural gas. Gas is supplied to the site through a 7 km underground pipeline from an off-take from the National Grid Gas National Transmission System south of Stanford-le-Hope. It has two ABB Alstom GT26 gas turbines driving two electricity generators. Gas turbine exhaust gas is led to two heat recovery steam generators. These power one steam turbine, connected to a further generator. The station connects to the electricity National Grid at the nearby 400 kV Coryton South substation.

== Gateway Energy Centre ==
Gateway Energy Centre is a proposed 1250 MW gas-turbine power station to be located on the London Gateway Logistics Park about 1 km west of Coryton power station. It will be either a gas-fired 2 × CCGT plant; a 1 × CCGT plus 1 × Open Cycle Gas Turbine (OCGT) facility, and/or a 320 MW battery energy storage system. It will be developed by InterGen. Original consent was granted in 2011, with subsequent revisions and consents granted in 2014 and 2016. CO_{2} capture facilities will be installed if mandated. Construction is likely to start in 2022 with commercial operation expected in 2024.

In 2020 InterGen gained consent for a 640 MWh lithium-ion battery storage power station near the site, capable of delivering 320 MW for nearly 2 hours. The £200 million project was expected to start in 2022 and to become operational in 2024, however, the site is still vacant and no news of when this will be completed.

== See also ==
- Spalding Power Station
