= Spalding Power Station =

Gas-fired power station

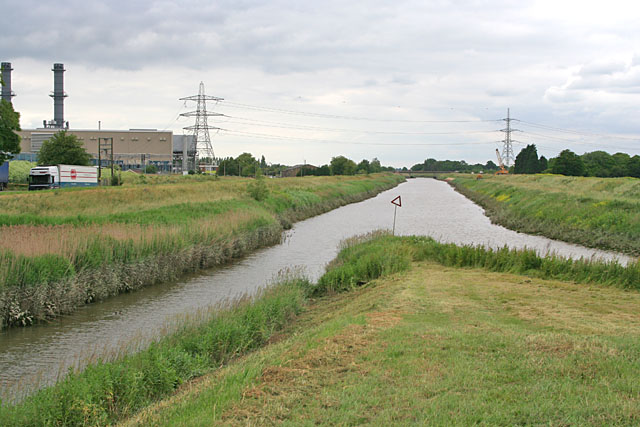
- Spalding Power Station; Viewed from the south in June 2006
- Country: England
- Location: Lincolnshire, East Midlands
- Coordinates: 52.8078°N 0.1321°W
- Status: Operational
- Construction began: 2001
- Commission date: 2004
- Operator: Intergen (Independent Generator)

Thermal power station
- Primary fuel: Natural gas
- Combined cycle?: Yes

Power generation
- Units planned: 1.8GW
- Nameplate capacity: 860 MW

External links
- Website: Spalding Energy
- Commons: Related media on Commons

Spalding Power Station is a 860 MW gas-fired power station one mile north of Spalding on West Marsh Road close to the River Welland. The current site provides enough electricity for one million households.

== History ==
The power station, known as the Spalding Energy Facility, is sited on a former sugar beet site of British Sugar. It was first proposed in October 1996 and given approval by the DTI in November 2000. It is run by the Spalding Energy Company Ltd, a subsidiary of InterGen. InterGen is owned by the Sev.en Global Investments.

The electricity is supplied to Centrica under a 17-year deal agreed on 22 May 2002; Centrica originally had 50% of the equity in the project in December 1999, and they supply the gas. It was the first power station to be project financed under the New Electricity Trading Arrangements in England and Wales, and funded by Barclays Capital.

It was InterGen's third UK power station after Rocksavage and Coryton. InterGen is based in Edinburgh, Scotland.

Construction began in March 2002. It opened in October 2004 at a cost of £425 million.

=== Expansion ===
In 2016 InterGen won 15-year Capacity Market contract from the UK Government. The expansion is on land adjacent to the existing power station. The new power plant is valued at £100 million. Construction of new 300MW facility is expected to be completed in June 2019.

In October 2018 new Siemens F-class Open cycle gas turbine brought to the construction site.

== Specification ==
It is powered by natural gas in a combined cycle (CCGT) plant. It features two General Electric 9FA+e gas turbines with two VOGT-NEM heat recovery steam generators and one Hitachi steam turbine. VOGT Power International is based in Louisville, Kentucky, and is owned by Babcock Power Inc. It uses two GE air-cooled turbo generators, rated at 296 MVA with a terminal voltage of 15.5 kV on each of the gas turbines. On the three-stage steam turbine is a Hitachi hydrogen-cooled turbogenerator, with a rating of 430 MVA and a terminal voltage of 24 kV. Actual power output depends on atmospheric conditions, such as temperature and humidity. 360 MW comes from the steam turbine generator, and 265 MW from each of the gas turbine generators.

== See also ==
- Sutton Bridge Power Station
- Peterborough Power Station, also supplies electricity for Centrica
