= Coveris =

Packaging manufacturer

Coveris Group
- Company type: Private
- Industry: Flexible Packaging
- Founded: May 2013
- Headquarters: Vienna Austria
- Products: flexible packaging, paper packaging, films, labels, board
- Website: coveris.com

Coveris is an industrial company with an operating unit in Vienna and owned by Sun Capital Partners, a private investment firm. Coveris is headquartered in Vienna and has 29 facilities located in Germany, France, the UK, Austria, Hungary and Egypt. It manufactures paper- and plastic-based flexible packaging for some brands. The company develops packaging for several types of products: food, pet food, medical devices, and industrial and agricultural products.

== History ==
In 2018, Coveris sold its packaging business in the Americas to Transcontinental, Inc for $1.320 billion in order to pay debts. After the sale, Coveris had 44 facilities across 14 countries.

Also in 2018, Coveris announced the sale of its Global Rigid Business to Lindsay Goldberg LLC for €700 million. After the sale, Coveris had 25 facilities in 5 countries and over 3,800 employees. According to the company, the purpose of the sale was to "strengthen our balance sheet and fully focus Coveris on the flexible packaging market".
