= Colin Watson (writer) =

British writer of detective fiction

John Colin Watson (1 February 1920 – 18 January 1983) was a British writer of detective fiction and the creator of characters such as Inspector Purbright and Lucilla Teatime. Born in Croydon, Surrey, he is best remembered for the twelve Flaxborough novels, typified by their comic and dry wit and set in a fictional small town in England which is closely based on Boston, Lincolnshire. He worked as a journalist in Lincolnshire and the characters in his books are said to be highly recognisable caricatures of people he encountered in his work.

His 1971 study of interwar thrillers, Snobbery With Violence, made the phrase popular for describing such authors as Dornford Yates. He was inducted into the Detection Club in 1970.

Watson was the first person to successfully sue Private Eye for libel, for an article in issue 25 when he objected to being described as: “the little-known author who . . . was writing a novel, very Wodehouse but without the jokes”. He was awarded £750. He died in Folkingham, Lincolnshire in 1983.

== Inspector Walter Purbright ==
The central character in the Flaxborough Chronicles is inspector Walter Purbright. His understanding of the case in hand emerges from a process of polite, measured enquiry. Purbright's decency is at the heart of Watson's thesis: that civilised life depends on basic tolerance, decency and the honesty of its guardians. His commitment to total impartiality, his refusal to be deflected by special interests and social position and his scrupulous refusal to cut procedural corners all go to make up a quintessentially English hero.

== Miss Teatime ==
Miss Lucilla Edith Cavell Teatime is a ladylike conwoman whose occasional lapses into verbal vulgarity make her all the more endearing. She has a liking for whisky, a game of dominoes and all things tasteful. She first steps off the train in Flaxborough in the fourth mystery set there, Lonelyheart 4122. She likes the town so much that she settles there, even though her attempt at swindling through a lonely-hearts bureau nearly makes her the third woman killed by another swindler. She appears in all subsequent Flaxborough novels except Blue Murder. By the eleventh volume, Plaster Sinners, she is the proprietress of the 'House of Yesteryear' in Northgate, Flaxborough, and a regular attender at local auctions. Her odd talents and sleight of hand remain much in evidence. On one occasion two glass decanters are rendered extremely cheap when she casually transfers the stoppers to a tray of miscellaneous items, which she then bids for as well. Her final appearance is in Whatever's Been Going On At Mumblesby? where we find her with an assistant called Edgar and offering opinions on the marketability of such religious relics as saints' kneecaps. In the 1977 Murder Most English BBC television series, which offered adaptations of four of Colin Watson's Flaxborough novels, Lucy Teatime was portrayed by Brenda Bruce.

== Adaptations ==
Four of the Flaxborough novels were adapted for television by the BBC under the series title Murder Most English. The four were Hopjoy Was Here, Lonelyheart 4122, The Flaxborough Crab and Coffin Scarcely Used. The adaptations successfully reflected key elements of the books: the gentle behind-the-times feel of a small English market town, the merciless targeting of the pretensions of some of the town's social leaders, and the author's notion that whatever exotic trappings are used to decorate the plot, the central crime is always motivated by money. Anton Rodgers starred as Purbright with Christopher Timothy as Detective Sergeant Love and Brenda Bruce as Miss Lucilla Teatime. Colin Watson produced the ninth Flaxborough novel, One Man's Meat, to coincide with the series. Although the novels are based on the Lincolnshire market town of Boston, some scenes for the adaptation were filmed in the much smaller market town of Alford, also in Lincolnshire. In that town, the original Victorian police station - complete with huge wooden hooks in the walls for the sergeants' horses' saddles - had only been replaced by a new police station four years earlier, in 1974. Hence, it was available, with all its trappings, for the production company.

Four of the novels were adapted for BBC Radio 4, Bump in the Night (1971), Lonelyheart 4122 (1990), Charity Ends at Home (1992) and (John Rowe starred in) The Naked Nuns (1993).

== Bibliography ==
=== The Flaxborough Novels ===
- Coffin, Scarcely Used (1958)
- Bump in the Night (1960)
- Hopjoy Was Here (1962)
- Lonelyheart 4122 (1967)
- Charity Ends at Home (1968)
- The Flaxborough Crab (1969) - U.S: Just What the Doctor Ordered
- Broomsticks over Flaxborough (1972) - U.S: Kissing Covens
- The Naked Nuns (1975) - U.S: Six Nuns and a Shotgun
- One Man's Meat (1977) - U.S: It Shouldn't Happen to a Dog
- Blue Murder (1979)
- Plaster Sinners (1980)
- Whatever's Been Going on at Mumblesby? (1982)

=== Other Novels ===
- The Puritan (1966)

=== Non-fiction ===
- Snobbery with Violence: English Crime Stories and Their Audience (1971) Eyre & Spottiswoode

Reprint. London: Eyre Methuen, 1987.
Reprint. New York: Mysterious, 1988, 1990.
