= Grade I listed buildings in South Holland =

There are over 9,000 Grade I listed buildings in England. This page is a list of these buildings in the district of South Holland in Lincolnshire.

== South Holland ==
Name	Location	Type	Completed (Note: The date given is the date used by Historic England as significant for the initial building or that of an important part in the structure's description.)	Date designated	Grid ref. (Note: The grid reference is based on the British national grid reference system, sometimes known as OSGB36, used by the Ordnance Survey.) Geo-coordinates	Entry number (Note: The "List Entry Number" is a unique number assigned to each listed building and scheduled monument by Historic England.)	Image
Church of St Mary	Cowbit	Parish Church	c. 1380	7 February 1967	TF2597918009; 52°44′42″N 0°08′07″W	1064482	Church of St Mary More images
Crowland Abbey	Crowland	Abbey	1155-1999	7 February 1967	TF2415510326; 52°40′35″N 0°09′54″W	1064550	Crowland Abbey More images
Holy Trinity Bridge	Crowland	Footbridge	pre 943	1 January 1962	TF2393910237; 52°40′32″N 0°10′06″W	1064508	Holy Trinity Bridge More images
Church of St Mary and the Holy Rood	Donington	Church	1868	7 February 1967	TF2082435943; 52°54′26″N 0°12′18″W	1064449	Church of St Mary and the Holy Rood More images
Bell Tower	Fleet	Bell Tower	c. 1300	7 December 1987	TF3886823666; 52°47′34″N 0°03′29″E	1064521	Bell Tower More images
Church of St Mary Magdalen	Fleet	Parish Church	c1180-1190	30 June 1966	TF3888823680; 52°47′34″N 0°03′30″E	1146568	Church of St Mary Magdalen More images
Church of St Mary Magdalene	Gedney	Parish Church	13th century	30 June 1966	TF4027824350; 52°47′55″N 0°04′45″E	1359231	Church of St Mary Magdalene More images
Church of St Peter and St Paul	Gosberton	Parish Church	12th century	7 February 1967	TF2375031759; 52°52′09″N 0°09′47″W	1064425	Church of St Peter and St Paul More images
Church of All Saints	Holbeach	Parish Church	c1340-80	30 June 1966	TF3591024789; 52°48′13″N 0°00′53″E	1064486	Church of All Saints More images
Church of St Mary	Long Sutton	Parish Church	Late 12th century	30 June 1966	TF4322822874; 52°47′04″N 0°07′20″E	1064562	Church of St Mary More images
Church of St Nicholas	Lutton	Parish Church	Early 16th century	30 June 1966	TF4330725559; 52°48′31″N 0°07′29″E	1359229	Church of St Nicholas More images
Sneaths Mill	Lutton	Windmill	1779	5 October 1976	TF4358424299; 52°47′50″N 0°07′41″E	1064530	Sneaths Mill More images
Church of All Saints	Moulton	Parish Church	c. 1180	7 February 1967	TF3071024115; 52°47′56″N 0°03′46″W	1147325	Church of All Saints More images
Moulton Windmill	Moulton	Tower Mill	c. 1822	7 February 1967	TF3075524035; 52°47′53″N 0°03′43″W	1308557	Moulton Windmill More images
Church of St Mary	Pinchbeck	Parish Church	12th century	7 February 1967	TF2419725594; 52°48′49″N 0°09′31″W	1064433	Church of St Mary More images
Church of St Margaret	Quadring	Parish Church	14th century	7 February 1967	TF2242434101; 52°53′26″N 0°10′54″W	1147013	Church of St Margaret More images
Church of St Lawrence	Surfleet	Parish Church	13th century	7 February 1967	TF2513628230; 52°50′13″N 0°08′38″W	1064403	Church of St Lawrence More images
Church of St Mary	Tydd St. Mary	Parish Church	12th century	30 June 1966	TF4461118591; 52°44′44″N 0°08′27″E	1204871	Church of St Mary More images
Church of St Mary	Weston	Church	c. 1170	7 February 1967	TF2924825153; 52°48′30″N 0°05′02″W	1064475	Church of St Mary More images
The Wykeham Chapel of St Nicholas	Weston	Chapel	Late 19th century	7 February 1967	TF2763526433; 52°49′13″N 0°06′27″W	1064471	The Wykeham Chapel of St Nicholas More images
Church of St Mary	Whaplode	Parish Church	c. 1150	30 June 1966	TF3235124013; 52°47′51″N 0°02′18″W	1359295	Church of St Mary More images
Ayscoughfee Hall	Spalding	Open Hall House	Mid 15th century	29 December 1950	TF2491322362; 52°47′04″N 0°08′58″W	1359532	Ayscoughfee Hall More images
Church of St Paul including attached former Sunday Schoolroom	Fulney, Spalding	Church	1877-80	20 November 1975	TF2614423802; 52°47′49″N 0°07′50″W	1306702	Church of St Paul including attached former Sunday Schoolroom More images
Parish Church of St Mary and St Nicolas	Spalding	Parish Church	1284	29 December 1950	TF2502422415; 52°47′05″N 0°08′52″W	1359547	Parish Church of St Mary and St Nicolas More images
Spalding War Memorial	Spalding	war memorial	1922	20 November 1975	TF2491722256; 52°47′03″N 0°09′01″W	1064002	Spalding War Memorial More images
