= William Sands =

William Sands may refer to:

- Sir William Sands, 1st Baronet (d. 1687), of the Sands baronets
- William Sands, senior (d. 1751), English architect
- William Sands, junior (c. 1730–c. 1780), English architect, son of the above
- William Sands (soldier) (1835–1918), American soldier
- William Sands (film editor) (1923–1984), American film editor
- William Franklin Sands (1874–1946), American diplomat
- Billy Sands (1911–1984), American actor
- Will Sands (b. 2000), American soccer player

== See also ==
- Sands (surname)
- William Sandys (disambiguation)
- William Sands Cox
