= Spalding War Memorial =

First World War memorial in Spalding, Lincolnshire

- United Kingdom
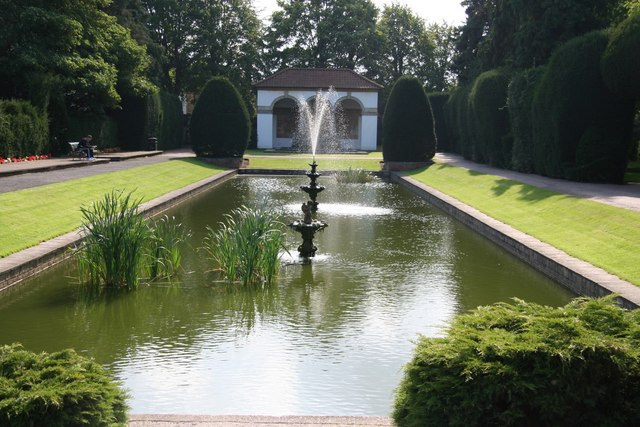
- For servicemen from Spalding killed in the First World War
- Unveiled: 9 June 1922
- Location: 52°47′0.5″N 00°08′57.4″W; Ayscoughfee Hall Gardens, Spalding, Lincolnshire
- Designed by: Sir Edwin Lutyens
- IN LOVE AND HONOUR / OF THOSE WHO / GAVE THEIR LIVES / FOR THEIR COUNTRY / IN / THE YEARS OF WAR / MCMXIV – MCMXIX / THIS MEMORIAL IS RAISED / IN THEIR HOME / BY THE MEN AND WOMEN / OF / SPALDING

Listed Building – Grade I
- Official name: Spalding War Memorial
- Designated: 20 November 1975
- Reference no.: 1064002

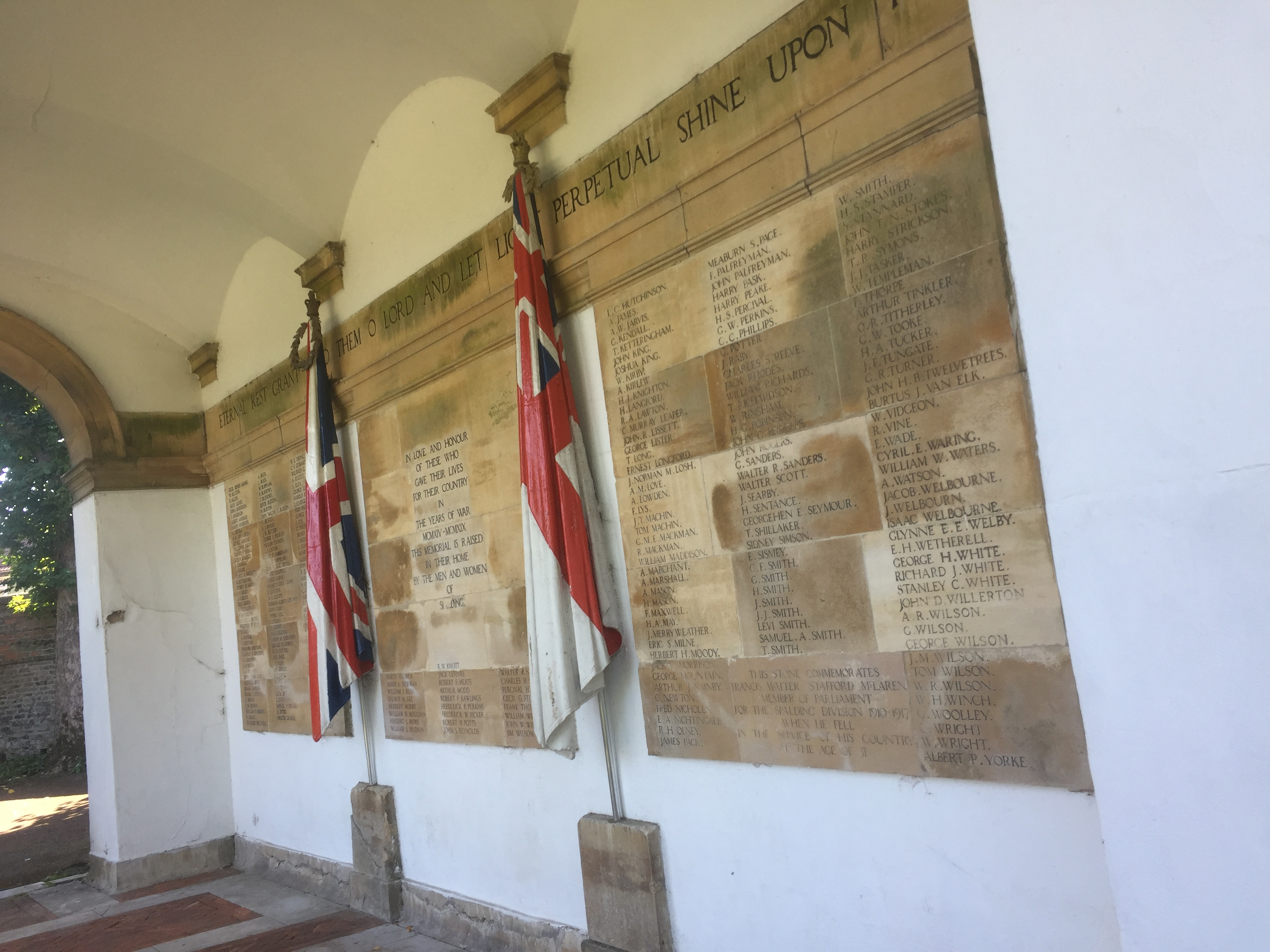

Spalding War Memorial is a First World War memorial in the gardens of Ayscoughfee Hall (pronounced /ˈæskəˌfiː/) in Spalding, Lincolnshire, in eastern England. It was designed by the architect Sir Edwin Lutyens. The proposal for a memorial to Spalding's war dead originated in January 1918 with Barbara McLaren, whose husband and the town's Member of Parliament, Francis McLaren, was killed in a flying accident during the war. She engaged Lutyens via a family connection and the architect produced a plan for a grand memorial cloister surrounding a circular pond, in the middle of which would be a cross. The memorial was to be built in the formal gardens of Ayscoughfee Hall, which was owned by the local district council. When McLaren approached the council with her proposal, it generated considerable debate within the community and several alternative schemes were suggested. After a public meeting and a vote in 1919, a reduced-scale version of McLaren's proposal emerged as the preferred option, in conjunction with a clock on the town's corn exchange building.

The total cost of the memorial was £3,500, of which McLaren and her father-in-law contributed £1,000 each; her brother-in-law donated a pair of painted stone flags and the remainder was raised from voluntary subscription, which took until 1922. The memorial consists of a brick pavilion at the south end of the garden and a Stone of Remembrance, both at the head of a long reflecting pool, which incorporates the remains of an 18th-century canal. It was unveiled at a ceremony on 9 June 1922. Lutyens went on to use the style of the pavilion for shelter buildings in several war cemeteries on the Western Front, though none of his other war memorials follow the design and the memorial became relatively obscure. Spalding War Memorial is today a Grade I listed building, having been upgraded when Lutyens's war memorials were declared a "national collection" and all were granted listed building status or had their listing renewed.

== Background ==
War memorials became a common sight in British towns and cities following the First World War (1914–1918). Almost one million men from Britain were killed in the conflict, and monuments were erected in virtually every settlement in the country. The memorial raised in Spalding, a town in southern Lincolnshire in eastern England, was designed by the architect Sir Edwin Lutyens, who had previously established his reputation designing country houses for wealthy clients. From 1917 onwards, Lutyens dedicated much of his time to the memorialisation of the war dead, first advising the Imperial War Graves Commission (IWGC) and later designing war memorials both for the commission and through his own practice. Spalding was one of his first war memorial commissions.

The proposal for the Spalding war memorial originated with Barbara McLaren (née Jekyll). Barbara was the widow of Francis McLaren – Spalding's Member of Parliament and a Royal Flying Corps officer, who was killed in a flying accident near RAF Montrose in 1917 – and the niece of garden designer Gertrude Jekyll, with whom Lutyens had collaborated on multiple previous projects. Lutyens designed the McLarens' London house on Cowley Street in Westminster in 1911 and shortly after Francis' death in 1917 designed the headstone for his grave in Busbridge in Surrey. He was later responsible for the war memorial in the same village.

== Commissioning ==
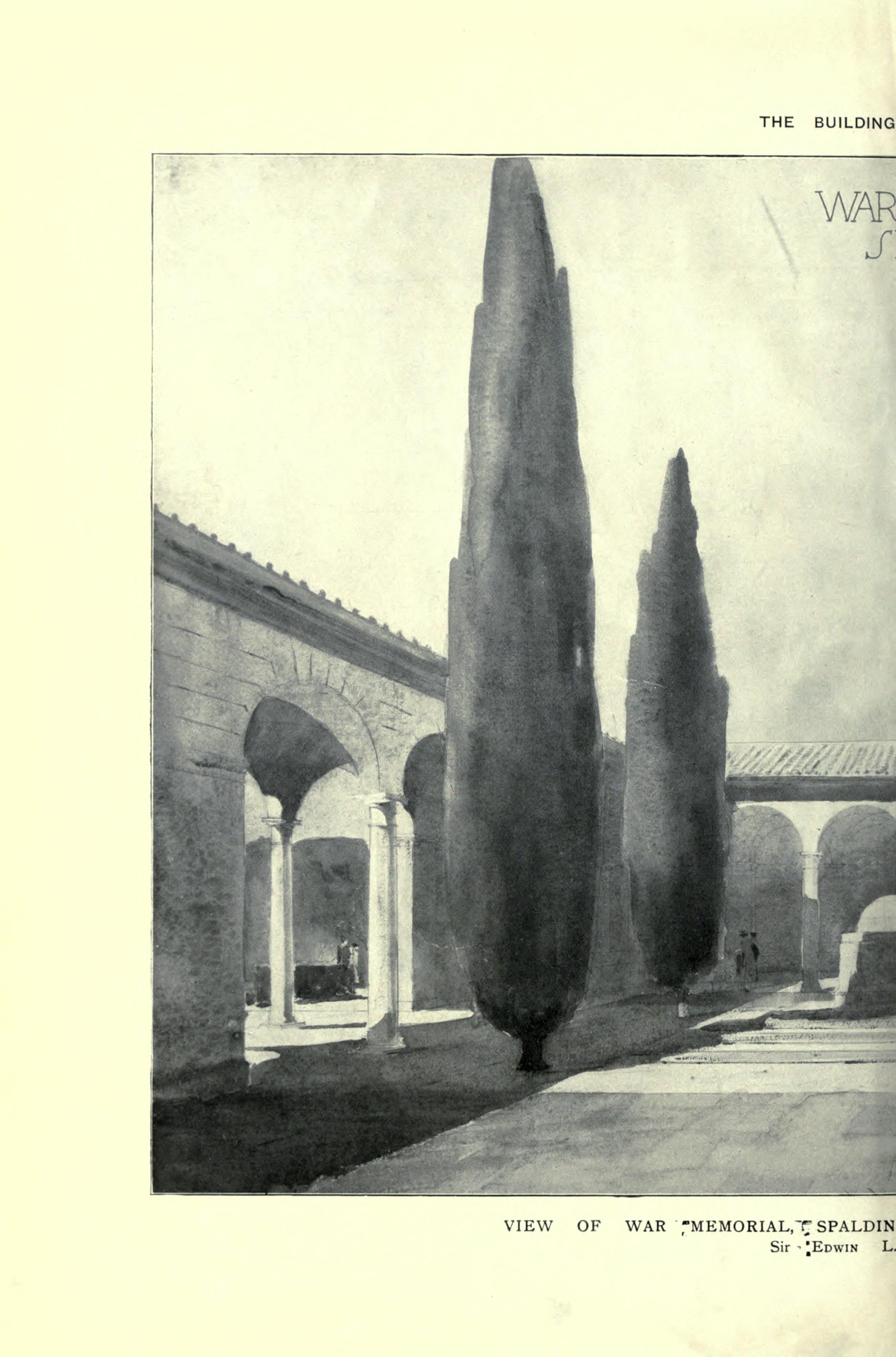
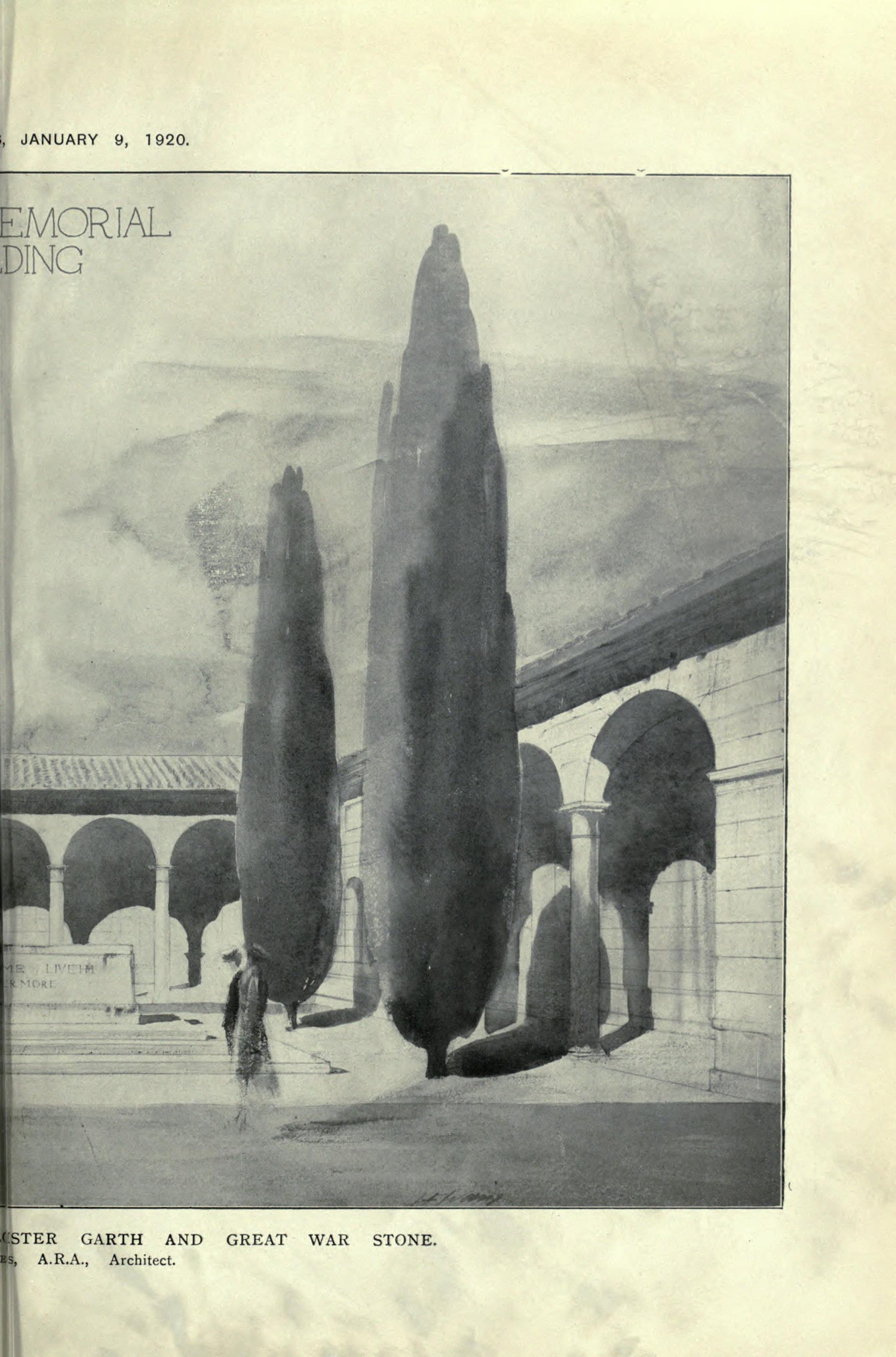
A double-page spread from the Building News and Engineering Journal (Volume 118, 1920) showing Lutyens's first plan for Spalding War Memorial, which featured a large cloister surrounding a lily pond and a Stone of Remembrance

Barbara McLaren engaged Lutyens to design a memorial for the gardens of Ayscoughfee Hall, which Spalding Urban District Council had purchased in 1897 to celebrate the Diamond Jubilee of Queen Victoria. Lutyens proposed a U-shaped cloister sheltering a Stone of Remembrance standing in front of a circular lily pool, in the centre of which would be a cross. McLaren hoped to include space for the families of those commemorated to add their own epitaphs but this proved impractical due to the amount of space that would have been required; she insisted that her husband not receive any special commemoration beyond that afforded to the other casualties.

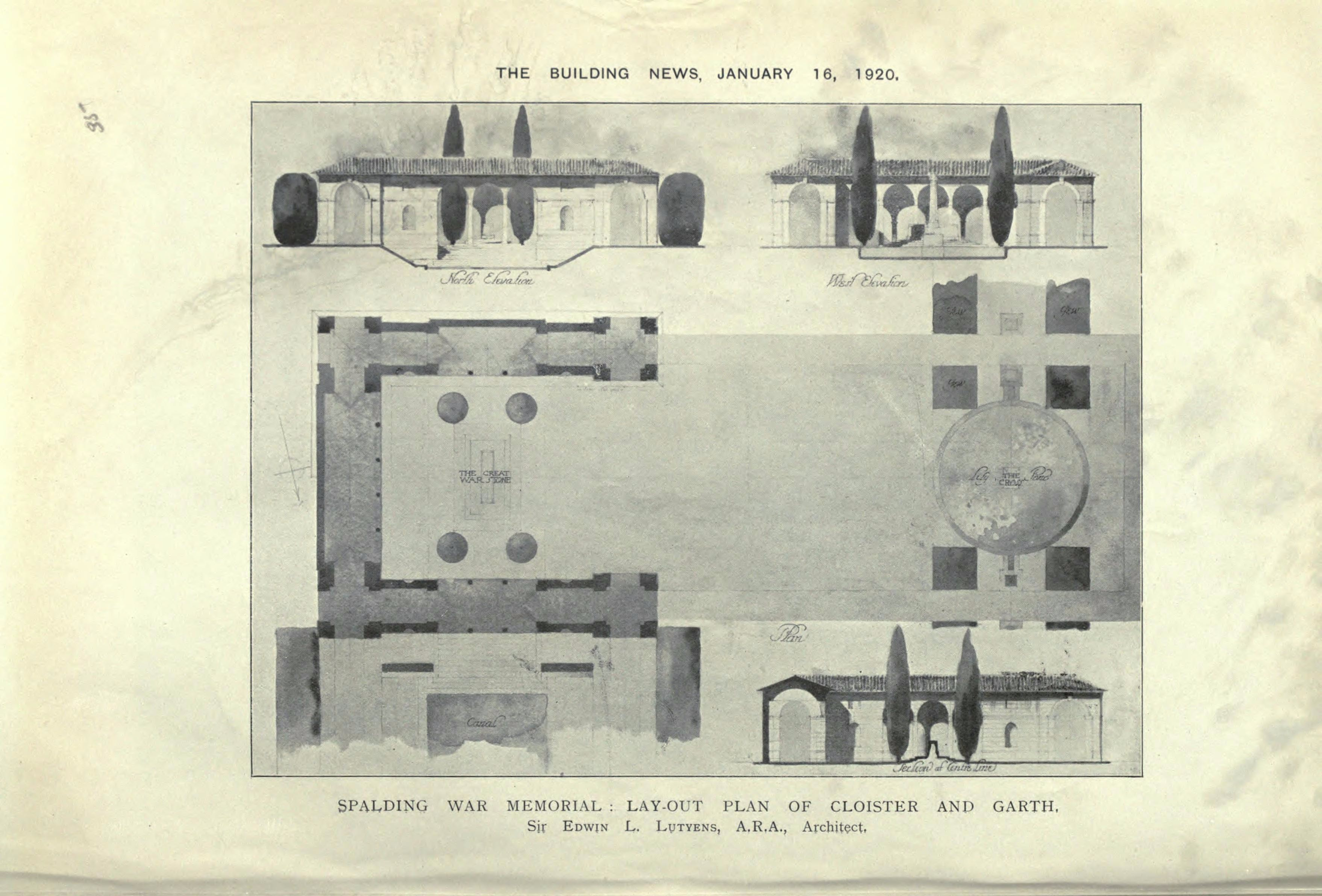
Lutyens's original proposal

McLaren approached the council with her proposal in January 1918. When it became public after the end of the war, the proposed scheme proved controversial, prompting debate within the community and on the letters pages of the local newspaper. Multiple alternative proposals were submitted, including both purely commemorative schemes such as a clock on the town's corn exchange building and functional schemes such as the conversion of Ayscoughfee Hall into a youth centre. The youth centre and Lutyens's proposal emerged as the leaders, and details of both were published in the local newspaper. The district council called a public meeting to debate the proposals, which was held on 1 August 1919. About three hundred people attended the meeting, at which the proponents of the two leading options plus a third proposal (the clock on the corn exchange) were allowed fifteen minutes each to outline their scheme. During the meeting, several other proposals were put forward, including a cenotaph or an obelisk in the market place. The meeting was closed with the decision to hold a public vote, which was held on 23 August. The ballot paper included seven options, with each voter selecting a single choice:

- A modified version of the McLaren–Lutyens scheme with a clock on the corn exchange building
- The McLaren–Lutyens scheme unmodified
- An obelisk in the market place and a memorial clock
- The McLaren–Lutyens scheme and a youth centre in Ayscoughfee Hall
- A cenotaph in the market place
- A war widows' fund (in lieu of a monument)
- The youth centre alone

The modified McLaren–Lutyens proposal emerged the clear winner, receiving 459 votes. The unmodified scheme was the second most popular option with 286 votes; the proposal for an obelisk and clock was the only other option to garner more than 200 votes.

In September 1919, the Spalding War and Victory Memorials Committee was formed to oversee fundraising and construction of the memorial, the total cost of which was £3,500. McLaren and her father-in-law Charles McLaren, 1st Baron Aberconway contributed £1,000 each, Sir Herbert and Dame Agnes Jekyll donated £100, Henry McLaren (Barbara's brother-in-law) donated the stone flags, and the remainder was raised by public subscription, which took until 1922.

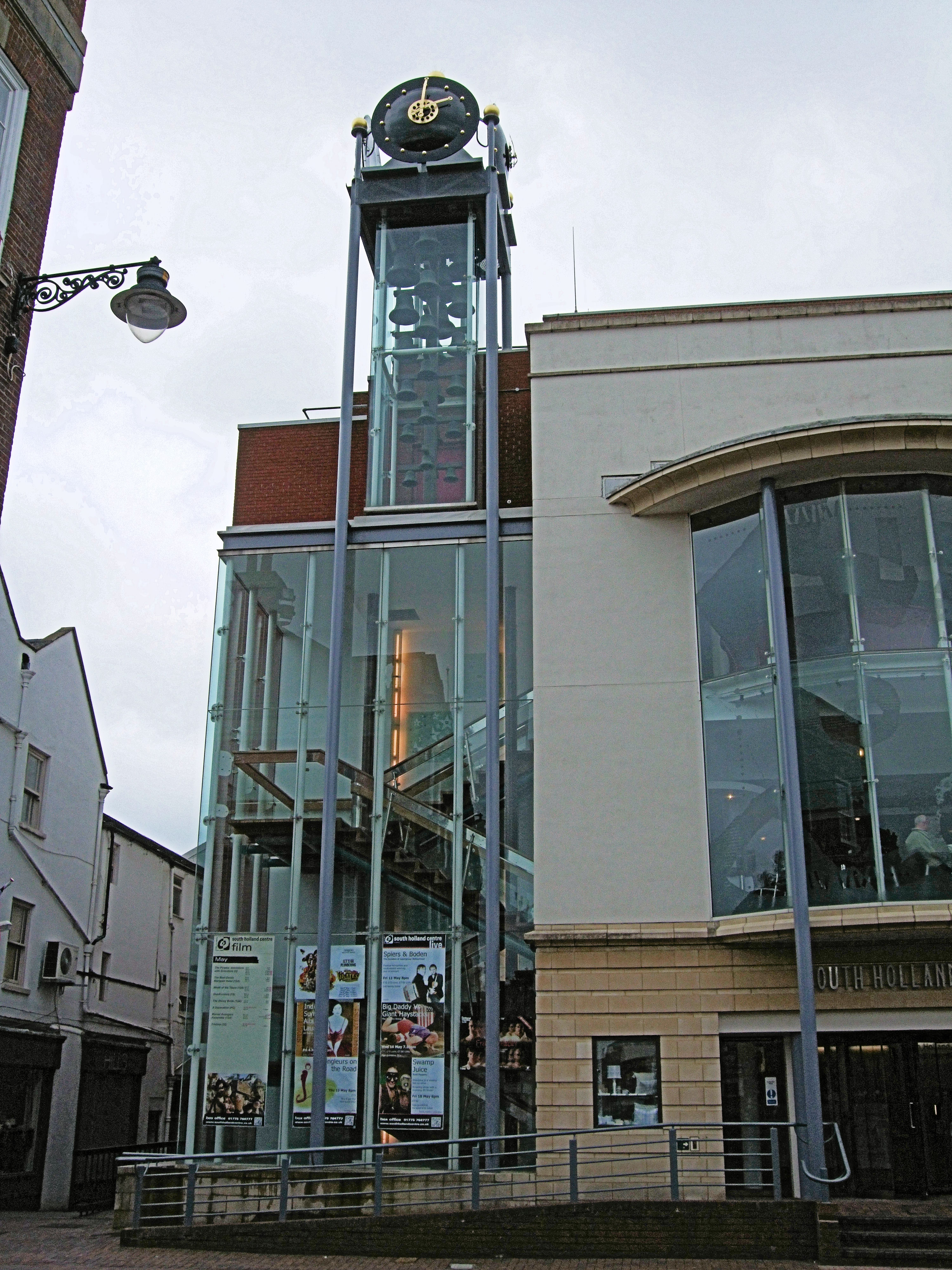
The 1922 clock and carillon, now housed in a glass tower attached to the South Holland Centre

The clock and carillon (bell tower) of 23 bells was erected in 1922, the same year as Lutyens's memorial, on the corn exchange in the town centre. Three of the bells were inscribed with names of casualties from the war, chosen to represent all of Spalding's war dead, while others were inscribed with names of those involved in the commemorations. The corn exchange was demolished in 1972 and replaced with the South Holland Centre, an arts venue, with the clock and carillon re-housed in a tower on the roof. After refurbishment of the South Holland Centre in 1998, a new glass tower was built to house the clock and carillon after the bells were cleaned. On Armistice Day (11 November) 1998, the Western Front Association unveiled a plaque on the South Holland Centre to explain the significance of the clock tower.

== History ==
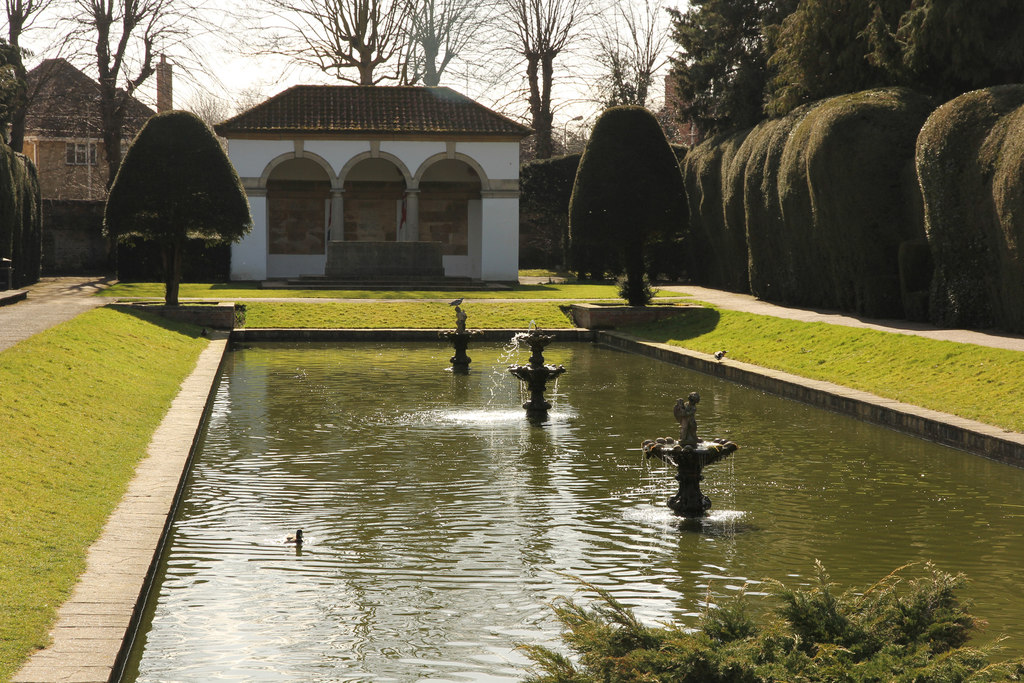
The memorial viewed from the side of the reflecting pool

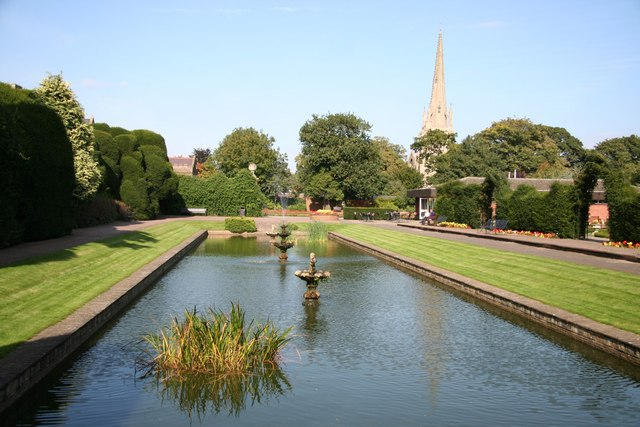
The view along the pool from the war memorial, with the spire of Spalding parish church in the background

Lutyens's memorial in Ayscoughfee Hall Gardens was constructed by Hodson Limited of Nottingham, at the south end of the formal gardens, replacing an earlier castellated tower – a 19th-century folly known as the "Owl Tower". The unveiling took place at a ceremony on 9 June 1922, presided over by General Sir Ian Hamilton and dedicated by Reverend Alfred Jarvis, Assistant Chaplain-General to Northern Command. Barbara McLaren attended the ceremony along with several other members of the Jekyll and McLaren families. Several dignitaries gave speeches at the ceremony, including Jarvis, who spoke of the dead among the poppies on the Western Front, a "symbol of oblivion". Hamilton spoke of the results of the carnage of the war; referring to the idea that the First World War was the war to end war, he told the assembled: "The result has been so different. Europe is a seething cauldron of racial hatred; Ireland [...] is linked in our minds with the idea of murder; Mesopotamia [modern-day Iraq], India, and Egypt are straining at the leash of civilisation." The general concluded: "If you want to end war, you must end hatred" and that "In that way, I believe we shall be working towards peace, and in that way we will be doing in our own small way our best each of us – and Spalding minds united are a great force – and in that way we shall perpetuate the memories of those whose untimely deaths we have come here to commemorate". At the conclusion of the speeches a lone bugler played the "Last Post" and the crowd sang the national anthem; the dignitaries, including McLaren and her sons, then laid floral tributes around the Stone of Remembrance.

The names of a further 24 casualties from the First World War were added to the central panel of the memorial prior to Remembrance Sunday 2014. The additions were the result of research by a member of the local branch of the Royal British Legion (RBL), which produced a list of fifty names, though the remaining casualties' connections to Spalding were deemed too tenuous for their names to be included. As a result of local government reorganisations, the memorial is now the responsibility of South Holland District Council, which is based in Spalding.

== Design ==
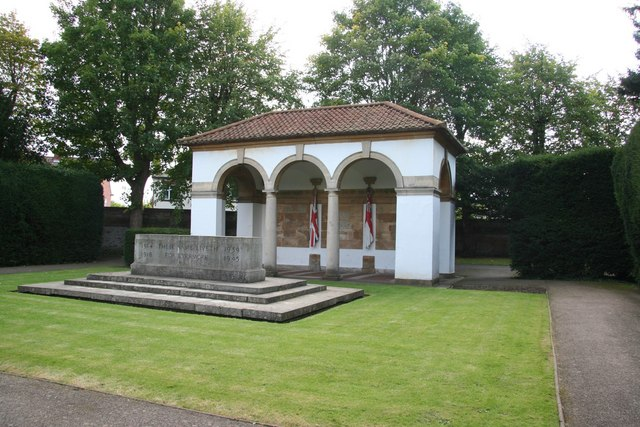
The pavilion and Stone of Remembrance

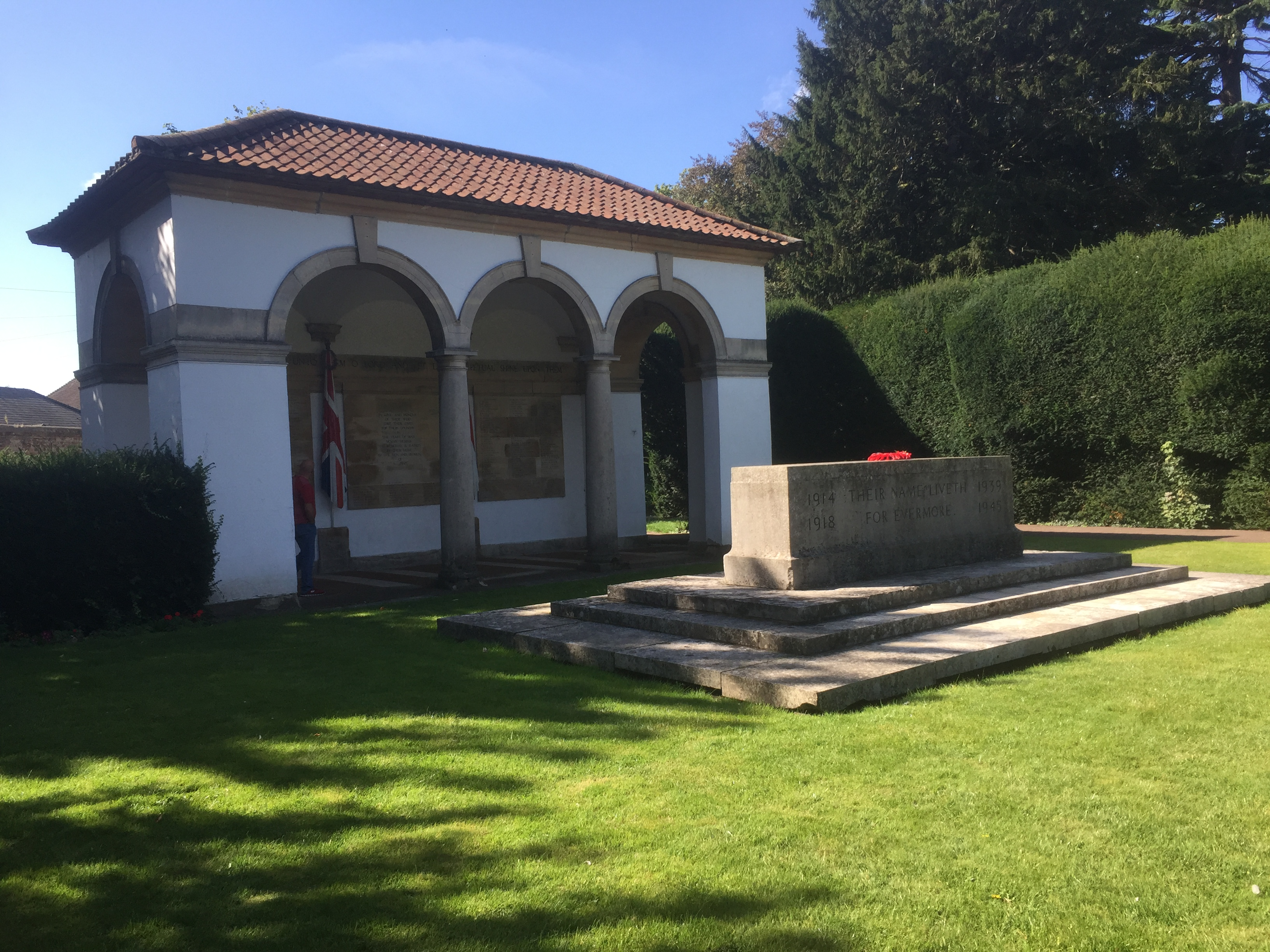
The pavilion and Stone of Remembrance

Spalding's war memorial comprises a brick-built pavilion structure with hipped roof of red pantiles and floored with red bricks in a herringbone pattern. The side of the pavilion facing the pool has three Tuscan stone arches, with another Tuscan arch opening on each sidewall. The solid rear wall bears two painted stone flags – the Union Flag to the left and the White Ensign to the right – and three panels on which are inscribed the names of more than two hundred servicemen from Spalding who died in the First World War. The central panel bears the dedication: "IN LOVE AND HONOUR OF THOSE WHO GAVE THEIR LIVES FOR THEIR COUNTRY IN THE YEARS OF WAR MCMXIV – MCMXIX / THIS MEMORIAL IS RAISED IN THEIR HOME BY THE MEN AND WOMEN OF SPALDING". The frieze inside the pavilion contains a further inscription: "ETERNAL REST GRANT TO THEM O LORD AND LET LIGHT PERPETUAL SHINE UPON THEM". A separate stone is dedicated to Francis McLaren and inscribed "THIS STONE COMMEMORATES FRANCIS WALTER STAFFORD McLAREN MEMBER OF PARLIAMENT FOR THE SPALDING DIVISION 1910–1917 WHEN HE FELL IN THE SERVICE OF HIS COUNTRY AT THE AGE OF 31".

A Stone of Remembrance is sited on a platform of three steps in front of the pavilion, inscribed with the phrase "THEIR NAME LIVETH FOR EVERMORE" and the dates of the two world wars (the dates of the Second World War were added at a later date, though the names of the casualties from that conflict were not). The stone is carved from a single piece of rock, with very slight curvature (entasis) barely visible to the naked eye. It is 12 feet (3.7 metres) long and devoid of any decoration besides the inscription. A long pool leads away from the structures – originally a canal from the garden first recorded in 1732, which Lutyens remodelled to form a reflecting pool in the style of an Italian formal garden; three low fountains were added at a later date. The pavilion and the pool are surrounded by yew hedges, which on the east side are broken at regular intervals by iron gates which lead to a peace garden, added in 1994. The view of the pavilion at the head of the reflecting pool is reminiscent of Bodnant Garden at Lord Aberconway's home in Wales, Francis McLaren's childhood home.

== Impact ==
By the time the memorial at Spalding was unveiled in 1922, Lutyens had already been engaged in work on First World War memorials in Britain and abroad for several years. He had designed The Cenotaph on Whitehall in London (the permanent version of which was unveiled in 1920), which became the focus for the national Remembrance Sunday commemorations. His work from 1917 for the Imperial War Graves Commission (eventually as one of the Principal Architects for France and Belgium) included the Stone of Remembrance (used in the first cemeteries from 1920) and the Thiepval Memorial to the Missing (unveiled in 1932, still the largest British war memorial in the world). The Cenotaph and Lutyens's connections from his pre-war work designing country houses led to commissions for dozens of war memorials across Britain and elsewhere in the Commonwealth. His initial design for Spalding was one of several of Lutyens's early post-war commissions featured in a war memorials exhibition hosted by the Royal Academy at the Victoria and Albert Museum in London in 1919. Historic England described Spalding as "an exceptional departure" from the usual style of Lutyens's war memorials. The design is not used elsewhere in his war memorials, but the pavilion had a significant influence on Lutyens's later designs for buildings in Imperial War Graves Commission cemeteries on the Western Front. The resemblance is said to be "striking" at Anneux British Cemetery, Cambrai, and the Tuscan loggia motif recurs at several other cemeteries as well.

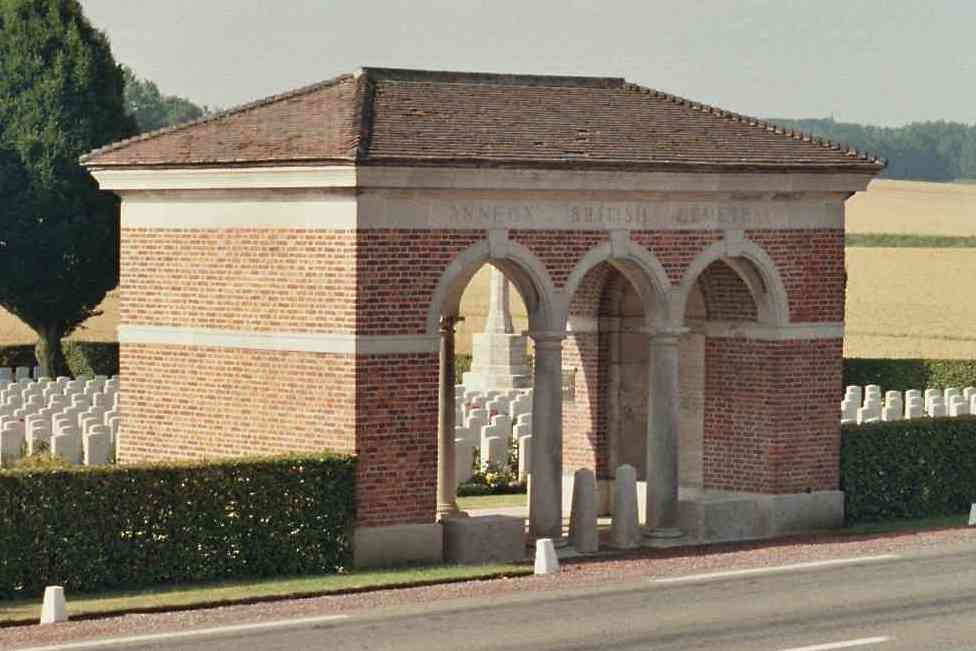
The entrance shelter at Anneux British Cemetery, Cambrai, France

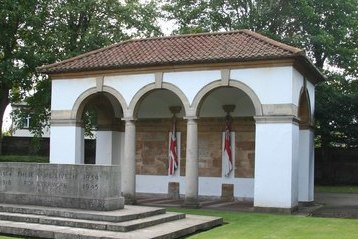
The pavilion at the Spalding War Memorial

Spalding's memorial became relatively obscure, and was not covered extensively in any publication about Lutyens's works until the publication of Tim Skelton's Lutyens and the Great War in 2008. Barbara McLaren later married Bernard Freyberg, an officer in the Royal Naval Division, which Skelton speculates may have led to Lutyens's commission for the Royal Naval Division Memorial on Horse Guards Parade in London.

The memorial was designated a Grade II listed building in November 1975. In November 2015, as part of commemorations for the centenary of the First World War, Lutyens's war memorials were recognised as a "national collection" and all 44 of his free-standing memorials in England were listed or had their listing status reviewed and their National Heritage List for England list entries updated and expanded. As part of this process, Spalding War Memorial was upgraded to Grade I. Ayscoughfee Hall itself is also listed at Grade I, while the gardens are listed at Grade II on the Register of Historic Parks and Gardens of special historic interest in England.

== See also ==
- Grade I listed buildings in South Holland, Lincolnshire
- Grade I listed war memorials in England
