= Cathedral of the Fens =

Cathedral of the Fens may refer to one of several Fenland churches in Eastern England:

- Ely Cathedral, Cambridgeshire
- St Mary Magdalene Church, Gedney, Lincolnshire
- St Peter's Church, Walpole St Peter, Norfolk
