= Ayscoughfee Hall =

Grade I listed building and associated land in Lincolnshire, England

Coordinates: 52°47′04″N 00°08′58″W

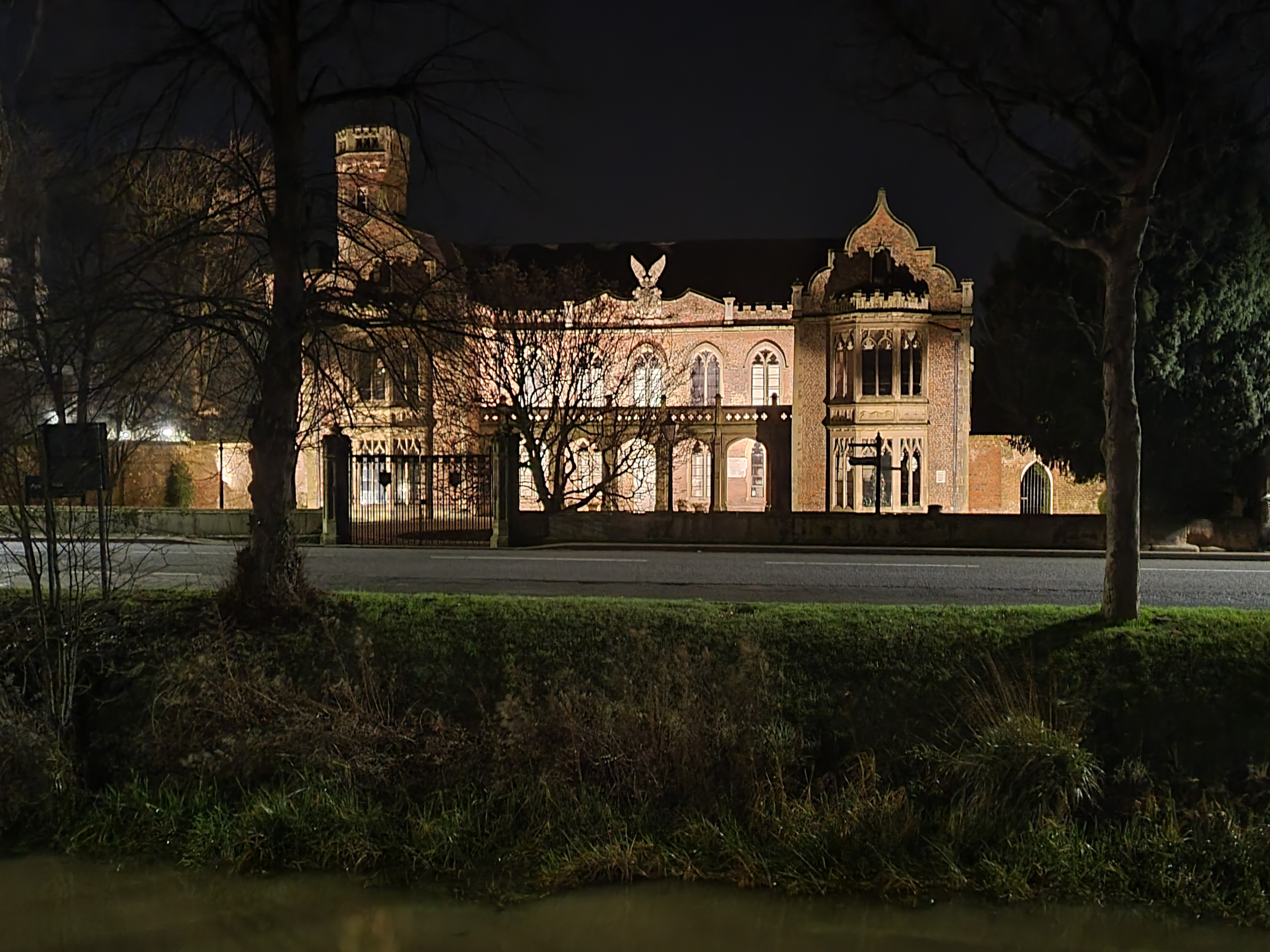
Illuminated Ayscoughfee Hall

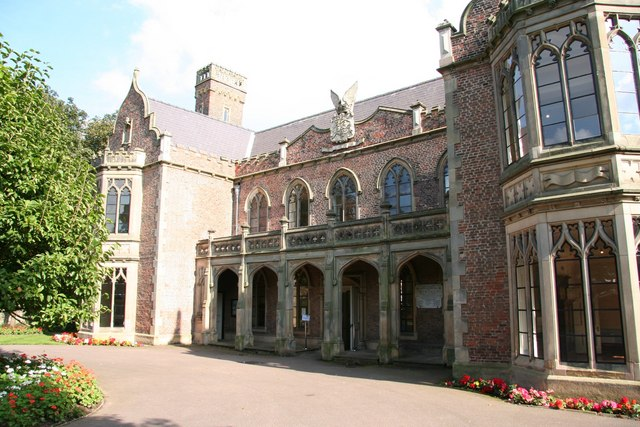
Ayscoughfee Hall (detail).

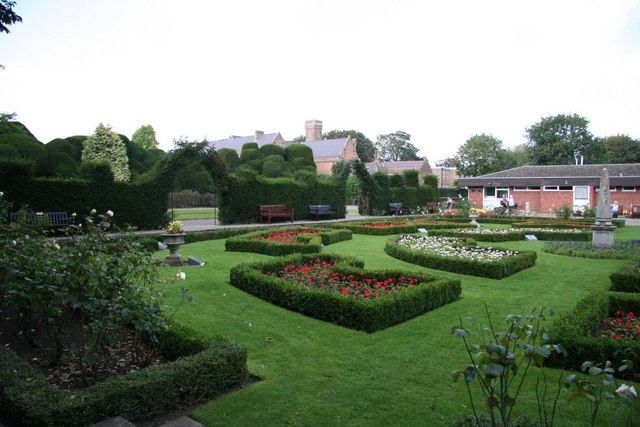
Ayscoughfee Hall Gardens.

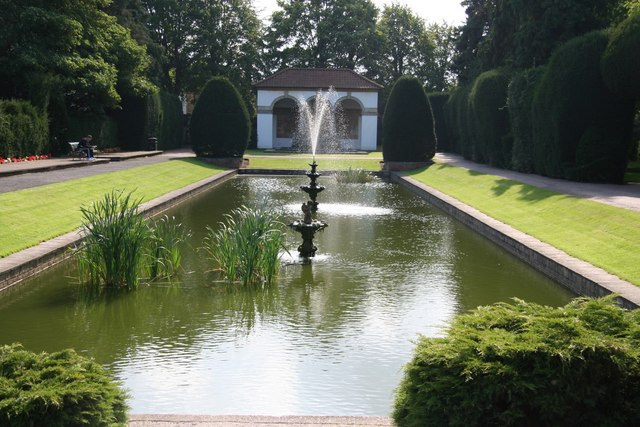
Ayscoughfee Hall Gardens; the building at the head of the pool is Spalding War Memorial.

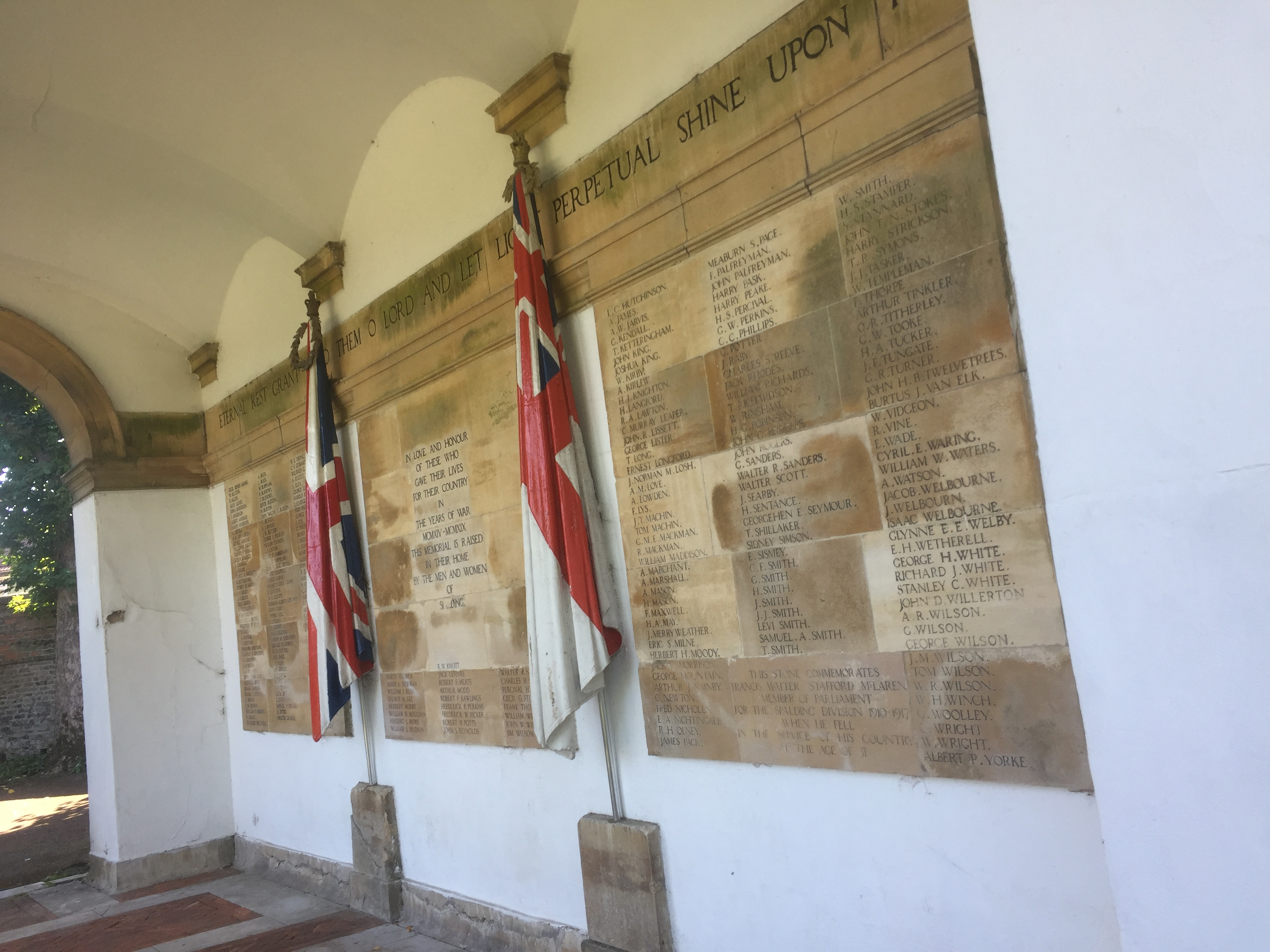
Memorial stone

Ayscoughfee Hall /ˈæskəˌfiː hɔːl/ is a grade I listed building and modest associated parkland in central Spalding, Lincolnshire, England, and is a landmark on the fen tour.

== History ==
The house, currently a museum, was built for a local wool merchant, traditionally supposed to be Richard Ailwyn (or Aldwyn) in the fifteenth century. A dendrological study of the roof timbers reveal that the house was built in one phase, with a completion date of the majority of the present building in 1451. Richard Ailwyn's son, Sir Nicholas Ailwyn, a member of the Mercers' Company, became Lord Mayor of London in 1499. The house is substantially unchanged from that period, and would be recognisable to a visitor from the fifteenth century.

The Hall was reputed to have belonged to the Ayscough (Askew, Ainscough) family in the early part of the 16th century – Fee referring to the Knight's Fee or living from the property. Early records name the house as Ayscough Fee Hall. A grant of land at Spalding was made to Sir William Ayscough (1490–1541) by Henry VIII. E. H. Gooch writes about "Ayscoughfee Hall" in his book "The History of Spalding", 1940.

In the seventeenth century, the Hall passed into the Johnson family. The most notable Johnson was the second Maurice Johnson, known as "the Antiquary" (1688–1755), who founded the Spalding Gentlemen's Society (the second oldest antiquarian society still in existence) in 1710. Maurice Johnson was a good friend of the more famous local antiquarian William Stukeley.

== Museum and civic amenity ==
When the last occupants, the family of Charles Foster Bonner, left in 1896, the Hall and Gardens were bought on behalf of the people of Spalding as a memorial of Queen Victoria's Diamond Jubilee, and was handed over to the town "free of debt" on 9 August 1902 in celebration of the coronation of King Edward VII and Queen Alexandra. Now a museum and civic amenity, the house was also used as a primary school for a number of years during the 20th century.

Some of the features of the 5-acre (20,000 m^{2}) gardens were reputedly laid out by William Sands in the early eighteenth century, and are still visible. The gardens include many fine features, including tall yew hedges, an early ice-house, and a fine ornamental lake. At the end of which sits the Spalding War Memorial (opened in 1922) which was designed by Sir Edwin Landseer Lutyens and became Grade I listed in 2015. Other features include a bowling green, tennis courts, aviary and a café. A rustic bandstand, built to commemorate the coronation of King George VI and Queen Elizabeth, was built in 1937 but was destroyed by arsonists in the early 1970s. The Friends of Ayscoughfee still arrange summer concerts on the south lawn during the summer months.

With Heritage Lottery Fund backing, and commitment from South Holland District Council, the Hall was closed in 2003 for a complete sympathetic restoration. The Hall was officially re-opened to the public as a museum and community facility on Friday 30 June 2006, by Dr Jonathan Clark, of the University of York. The Hall has recently started to develop events, including theatrical performances, craft fairs, etc. and is licensed for civil wedding ceremonies.

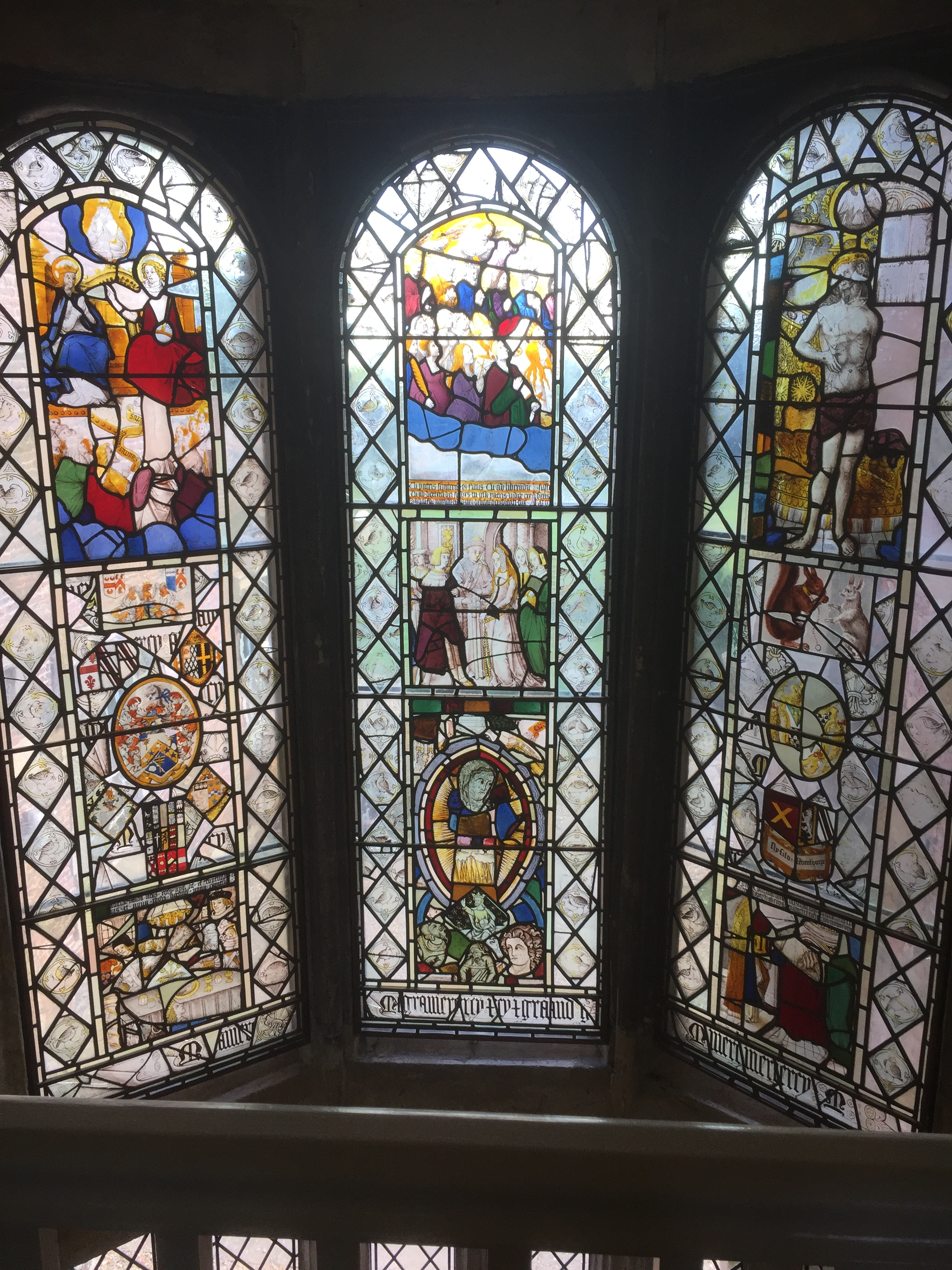
Stained glass

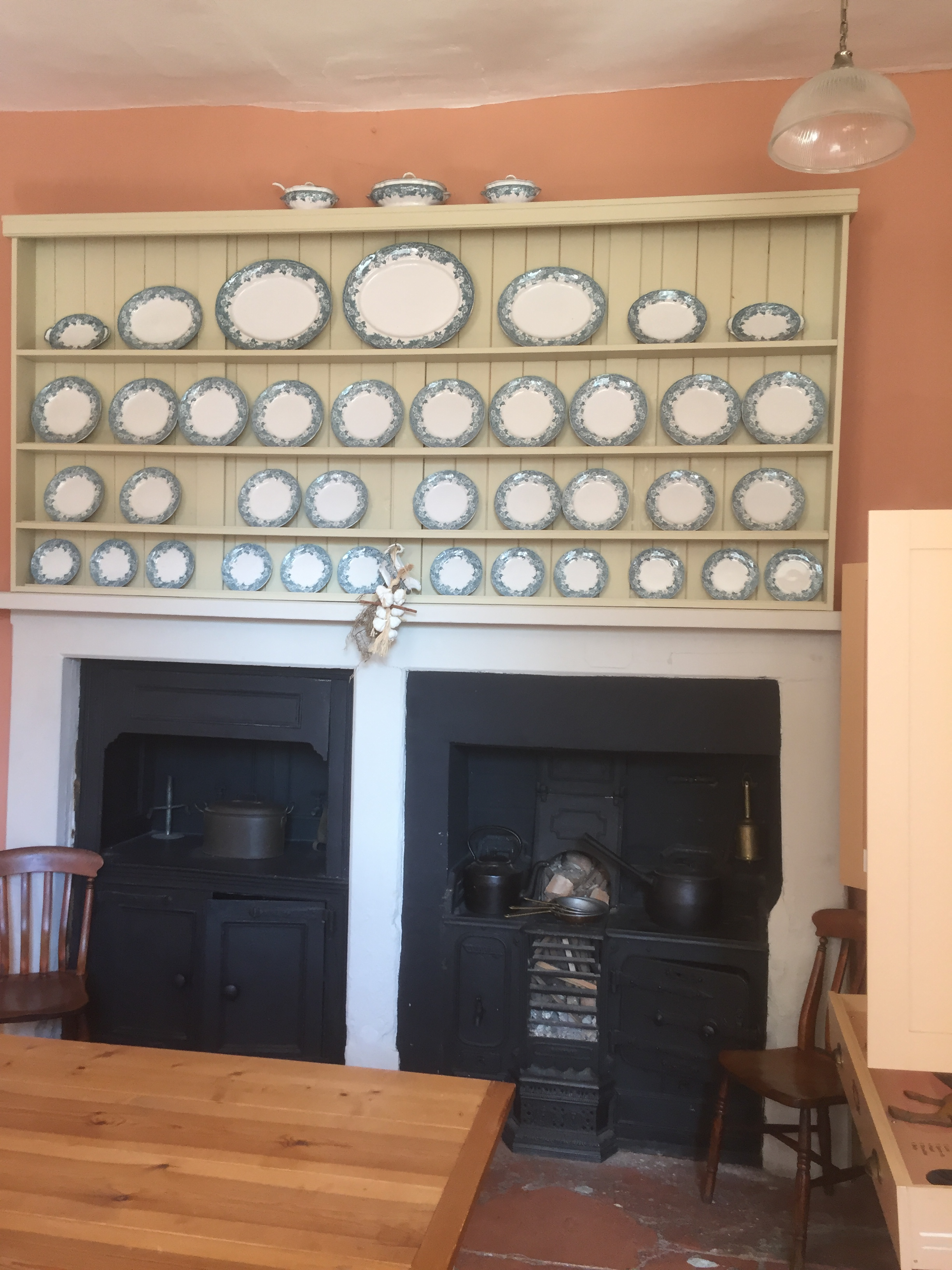
Kitchen exhibition
