= William Sandys =

William Sandys may refer to:

- William Sandys, 1st Baron Sandys (1470–1540), English diplomat
- William Sandys, 3rd Baron Sandys (died 1623)
- William Sandys, 4th Baron Sandys (died 1629)
- William Sandys, 6th Baron Sandys (died 1668), Cavalier officer in the Royalist army during the English Civil War
- William Sandys (MP for Winchester) (c. 1575–1628), English MP and magistrate
- William Sandys (waterworks engineer) (1607–1669), English MP and waterworks engineer
- William Sandys (antiquarian) (1792–1874), English antiquarian and Christmas carol collector

== See also ==
- Sandys (surname)
- William Sands (disambiguation)
