= William Sands, junior =

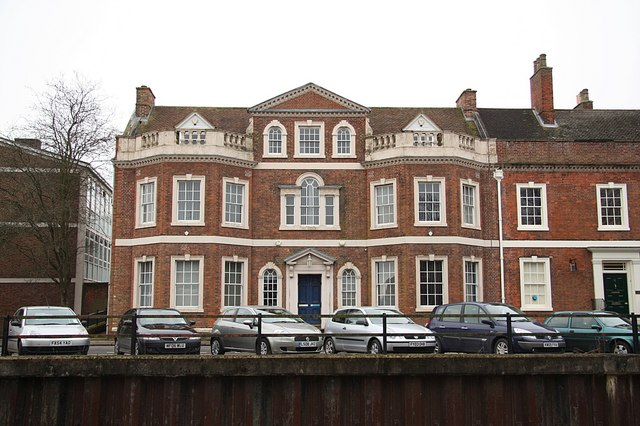
- Holland House, Spalding.
- Born: Unknown ?Spalding, Lincolnshire
- Died: c.1780 ?Spalding, Lincolnshire
- Occupation: Architect

William Sands, junior (c.1730-c.1780), was an English architect who worked in Spalding, Lincolnshire. He was the son of the architect William Sands, senior. He is known to have designed three houses in the Spalding High Street in 1768. These were Holland House, Westbourne House and Langton House.

== Literature ==
- Antram N (revised), Pevsner N & Harris J, (1989), The Buildings of England: Lincolnshire, Yale University Press.
- Colvin H. A (1995), Biographical Dictionary of British Architects 1600-1840. Yale University Press, 3rd edition London.pg 848
- Roberts D L (ed. Shaun Tyas), (2018), Lincolnshire Houses, Tyas, Donnington. ISBN 9781900289719.
