= Lutton, Lincolnshire =

Village and civil parish in the South Holland district of Lincolnshire, England

Coordinates: 52.808°N 0.125°E

Lutton
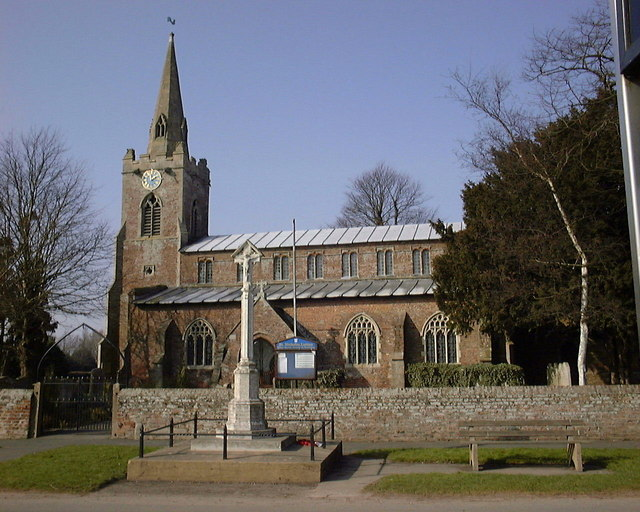
- St Nicholas' Church, Lutton

- Location within Lincolnshire
- Population: 1,261 (2011)
- OS grid reference: TF433255
  - London: 90 mi (140 km) S
- District: South Holland
- Shire county: Lincolnshire
- Region: East Midlands
- Country: England
- Sovereign state: United Kingdom
- Post town: Spalding
- Postcode district: PE12
- Dialling code: 01406
- Police: Lincolnshire
- Fire: Lincolnshire
- Ambulance: East Midlands
- UK Parliament: South Holland and the Deepings

Lutton (sometimes Lutton-Bourne) is a village and civil parish in the South Holland district of Lincolnshire, England. The population of the civil parish at the 2011 census was 1,261. It is situated about 4 miles (6 km) north-east from the town of Holbeach. The village has been known by the alternative name of Sutton St Nicholas. The civil parish comprises the village of Lutton, with Lutton Marsh to the north-east and Lutton Garnsgate to the south-west.

Lutton is recorded in the 1086 Domesday Book as "Luctone", with 16 households, 60 acres (0.24 km^{2}) of meadow and one fishery. By the 8th century Lutton had become an established Anglo-Saxon settlement by the sea. Until the dissolution of the monasteries the Church belonged to the estates of the Cluniacs of Castle Acre Priory, Norfolk. For many centuries the village was part of the estates of the Duchy of Lancaster.

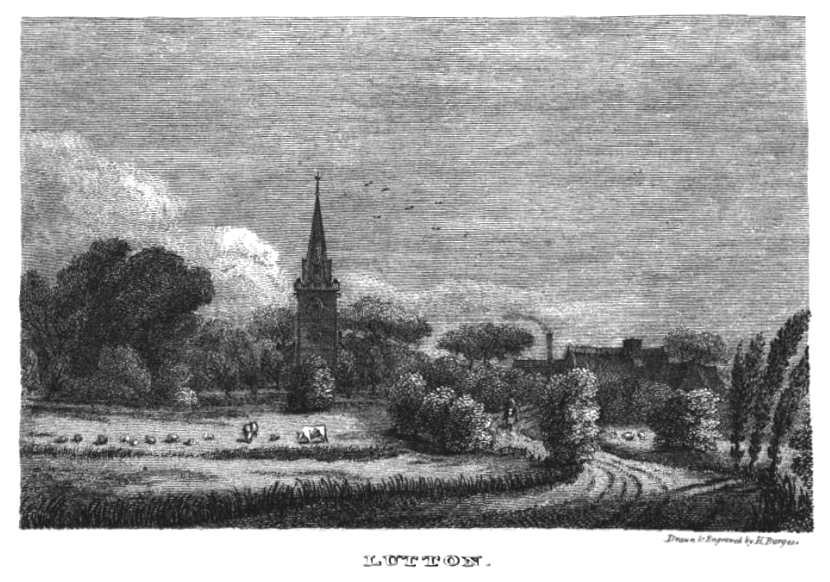
St Nicholas' Church, c. 1816

The present church of St Nicholas is a Grade I listed building dating almost entirely from the 16th century, and built of red brick.

The former Cock and Magpie public house dates from the late 18th century, is Grade II listed, and is now a private cottage.

Garnsgate Hall is an early 18th-century red-brick Grade II* listed building. It was built by the Delamore family about 1685 but was heavily remodelled, or completely rebuilt, in the early part of the 18th century in Queen Anne style. The family sold the house in 1749, after which the Allenby family owned the Hall for over 150 years. Historic people have links with the Hall: a descendant of Oliver Cromwell and Viscount Edmund Allenby's father and stepbrother in turn owned the Hall so Allenby might have stayed there at some point (the Hall passed to Viscount Allenby's stepbrother from his father's first marriage). Currently it is run as a bed and breakfast and farm shop. Garnsgate Hall is in Lutton Garnsgate across the A17 from Long Sutton.

Lutton has a primary school called Lutton St Nicholas Primary School.

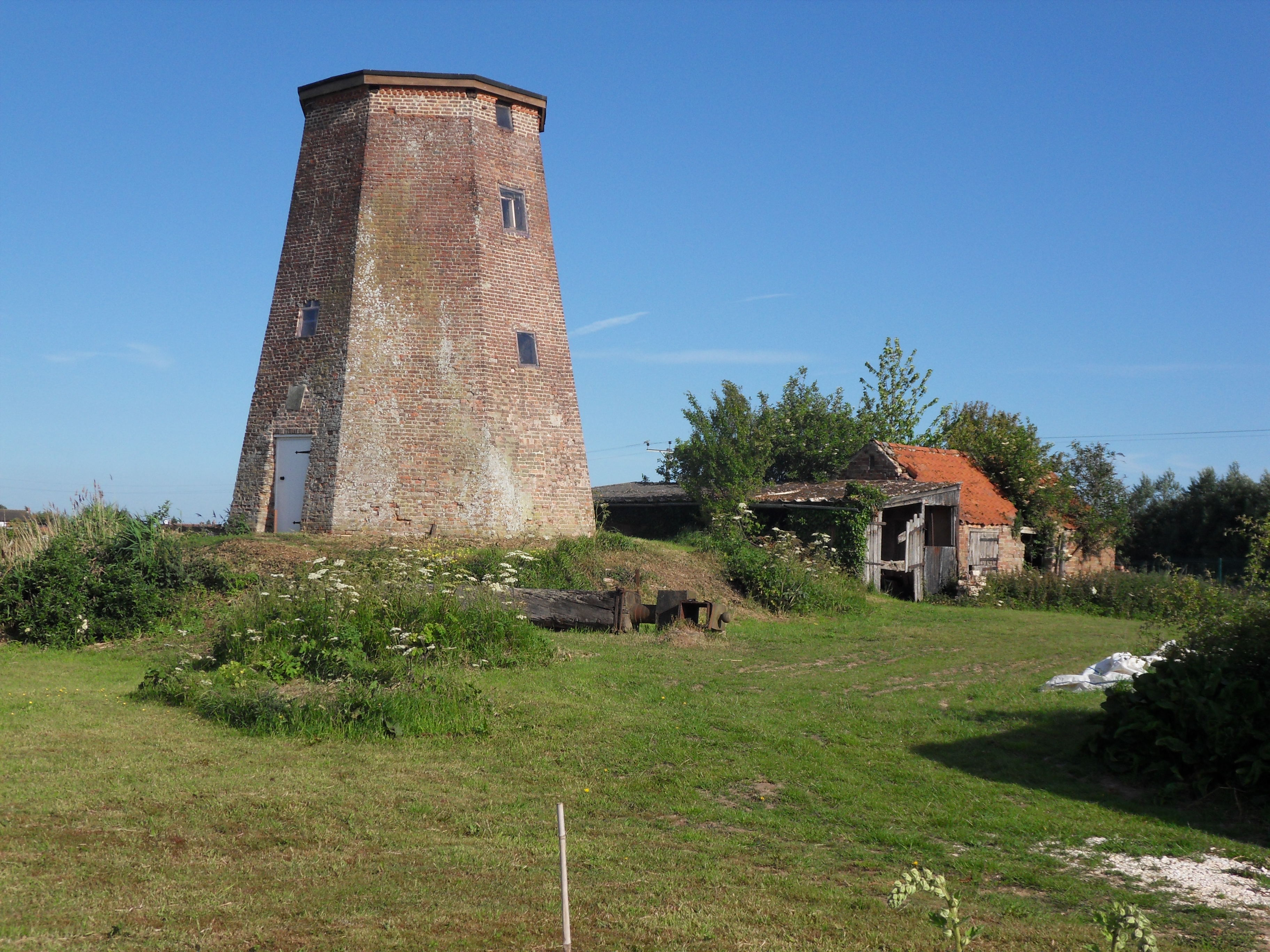
Sneaths Mill, Lutton

Sneaths Mill, sometimes called Lutton Gowt Mill, is a red-brick four storey octagonal windmill. It has a datestone of 1779, but this is the date that an older wooden smock mill was encased in brick. It is Grade II listed although it ceased working after a storm in the 1930s.
