= St Paul's Church, Fulney =

Church in Lincolnshire, England

Coordinates: 52.7973°N 0.1302°W

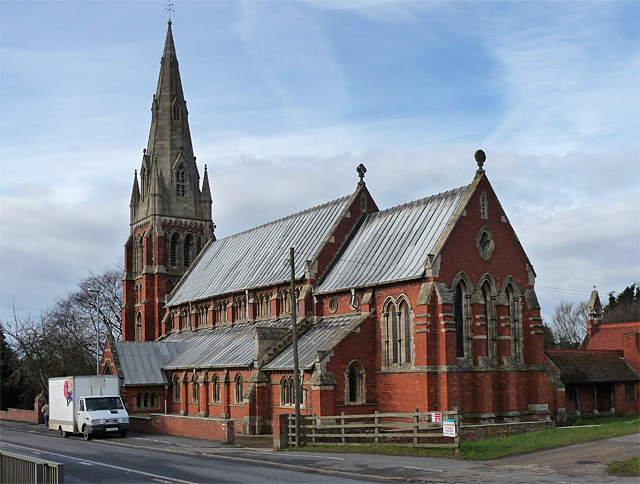
The church, seen in 2010

St Paul's Church is a grade I listed church in Fulney, Spalding, Lincolnshire, England. It was designed by George Gilbert Scott in 1877–78, along with its schoolroom which is included in the listing and the grade II* listed vicarage, although it was not built until 1880, after his death.
