= William Sands, senior =

English architect and mason who worked in Spalding, Lincolnshire

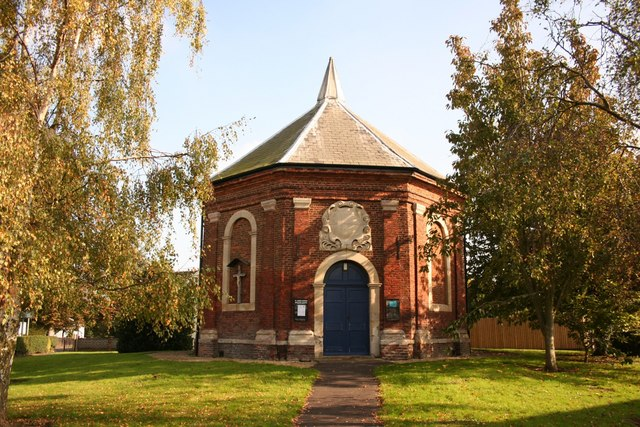
- St James' church, Moulton Chapel by William Sands, 1722.
- Born: Unknown ?Spalding, Lincolnshire
- Died: 2 October 1751; Spalding, Lincolnshire
- Occupation: Architect
- Buildings: St James' church, Moulton Chapel

William Sands, senior (died 1751), was an English architect and mason who worked in Spalding, Lincolnshire. He was master of the Freemason’s Lodge and a member of the Spalding Gentlemen's Society. He appears to have been an architect who supplied plans for houses for other craftsmen to construct. Sands was also a monumental mason. Examples of his work can be seen in Croyland Abbey and the church at Weston, Lincolnshire. His architectural practice was continued by his son William Sands, junior.

== Works ==
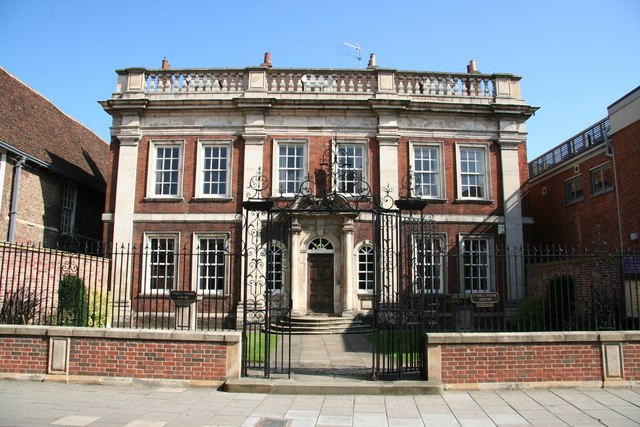
Fydell House - Boston, possibly by Wiliiam Sands

- Fydell House, Boston. This early 18th century house was attributed to Sands by Nikolaus Pevsner. Previously the house had been attributed to Henry Bell. Pevsner dated the house to 1726, fifteen years after Bell’s death, dismissing Bell as the architect. More recent research suggests that Fydell House had been built before 1704, in which case Bell may have been the architect. The argument that Fydell House was by Sands is based on the similarity of certain design features with the Moulton Chapel, designed by Sands in 1722. Both buildings have similar giant Doric order pilasters and appear to be influenced by the early eighteenth century Dutch brick architectural tradition. Pevsner, however, views it as the work of a provincial hand.

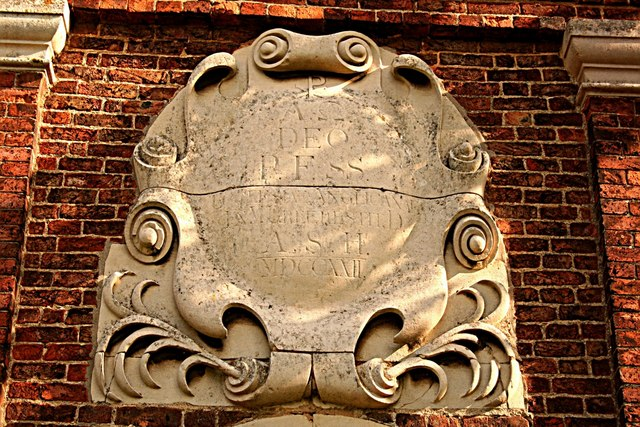
Baroque datestone 1722, St James' church, Moulton Chapel

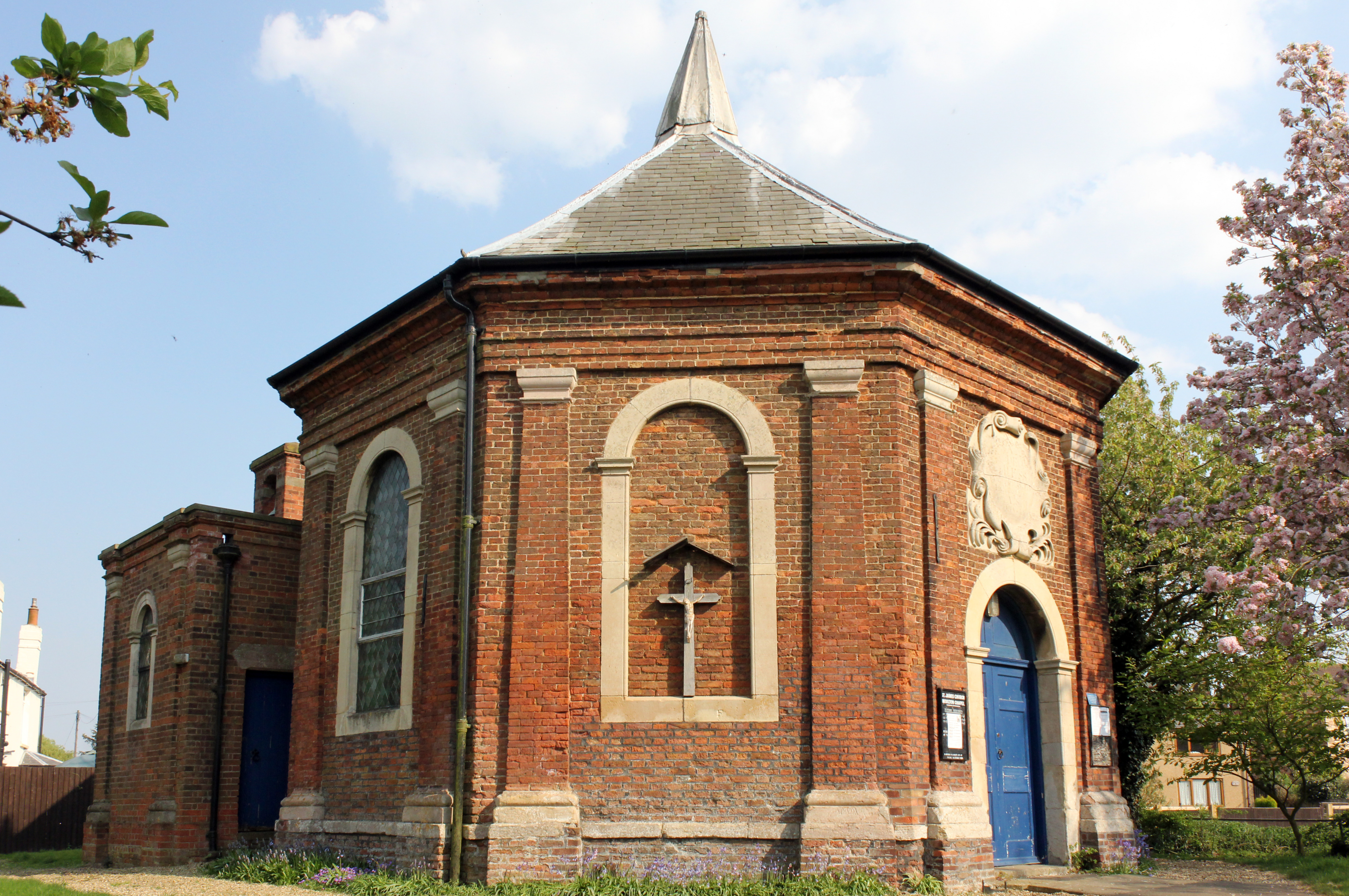
Chapel of St James, Woodgate Road, Moulton Chapel

- Moulton Chapel, St James Moulton. The original church is brick and octagonal in form. Each side of the octagon has a pair of giant pilasters of the Doric order, similar to the pilasters on the façade of Fydell House. The doorway and widows are arched and the interior has a domed roof. A baroque date inscription is present. The Spalding Gentlemen's Society has a drawing by John Talman showing that the architect had originally intended to surmount the building with a cupola. It can be compared with the less ornate octagon Presbyterian and later Unitarian Octagon Chapel of 1756 in Norwich, which is thought to have been inspired by the architecture of the Low Countries.
- Monks Hall, Quadring Road, Gosberton, Lincolnshire. Farmhouse (1729) Sands supplied the plans to John Proudlove, a carpenter of Kirton. The present house was substantially altered in the mid and late nineteenth century. Roughcast rendered brickwork with slate roof with raised rendered gables were added. The farmhouse had two stories, a three-bay front with a dentillated wooden eaves cornice. The interior retains the original pegged clasped purlin roof. The site is surrounded by a moat and was originally a tenth-century cell of Peterborough Abbey.
- Burton Pedwardine, Lincolnshire. Sands drew up plans for a new mansion, but they were never executed.

== Literature ==
- Pevsner, Nikolaus; Harris, John; Antram, Nicholas (1989). Lincolnshire. Yale University Press. ISBN 978-0-300-09620-0.
- Colvin, Howard (2008). A Biographical Dictionary of British Architects, 1600-1840. Yale University Press. ISBN 978-0-300-12508-5.
