= St Mary and St Nicolas, Spalding =

Parish church in Spalding, Lincolnshire

Coordinates: 52°47′06″N 0°8′52″W

St Mary and St Nicolas Church
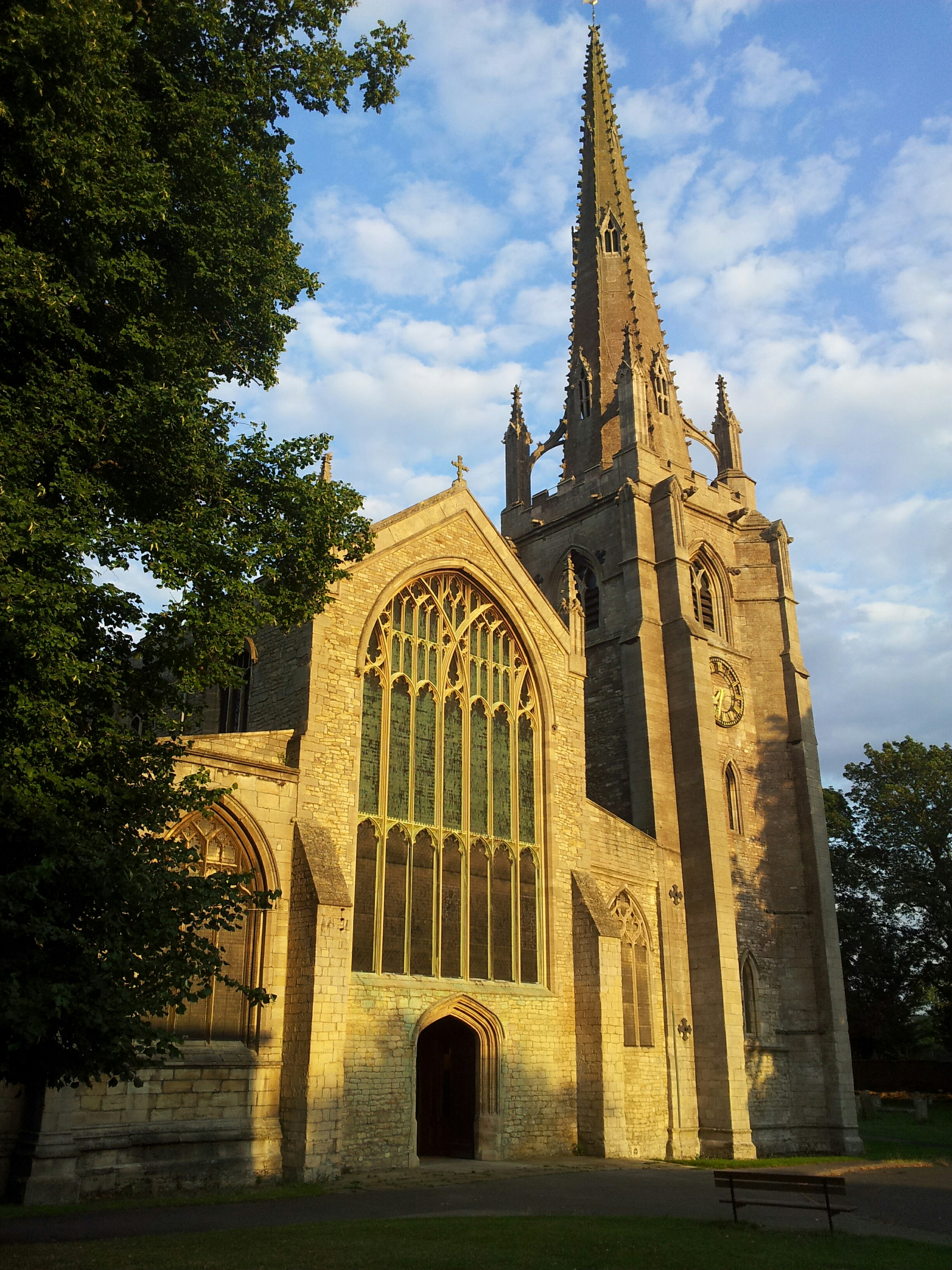
- St Mary & St Nicolas, Spalding
- St Mary and St Nicolas Church
- Denomination: Church of England
- Website: www.stmaryandstnicolas.org.uk

History
- Dedication: St Mary and St Nicolas

Administration
- Province: Province of Canterbury
- Diocese: Lincoln
- Parish: Spalding, Lincolnshire

Clergy
- Vicar: Revd Rob Parker-McGee

The Church of St Mary and St Nicolas is an active Church of England parish church in Spalding, Lincolnshire, England. It was built c. 1284 on the site of an earlier church, and is a Grade I listed building.

== History ==
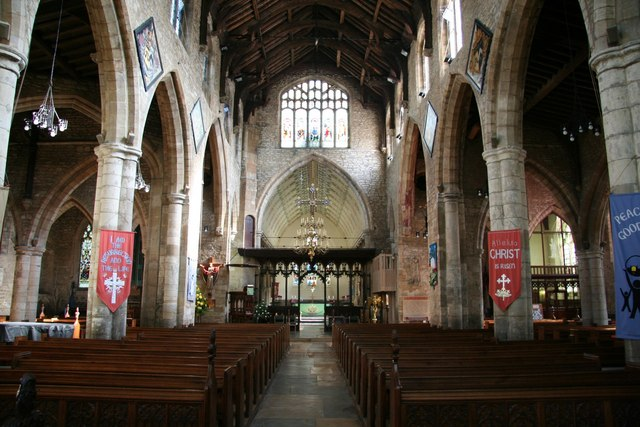
The nave interior, looking east

After the Norman Conquest in 1066, monks from the Abbey of Saint Nicolas in Angers, in France, were sent to take control of Spalding Priory. In 1284 Prior William of Littleport laid the foundations for a new parish church to replace the earlier parish church which was situated on the Priory boundary, on the site of the Sheep Market.

The record states that the new church was to be built “on the other side of the water towards the east, in the great cemetery where was formerly a certain chapel which was called the Chapel of the blessed Thomas the Martyr”. The church was completed after the death of Prior William by his successor Clement of Hatfield (1293-1318).

The building was cruciform. It consisted of an aisled nave with six bays, aisled transepts of two bays, a chancel without an aisle and a bell tower.

In 1360, the west aisle of the south transept and the south aisle of the nave were widened, and the outer south aisle added. Also, at this time, the south porch and the tower were built.

In the middle of fifteenth century the chancel screen and a rood were added, reached by a spiral staircase. The pillars were heightened by six feet and the clerestory windows were added. The great west window was built in the Perpendicular style and a hammerbeam roof with angels was constructed.

High box pews with galleries above them and a three-decker pulpit were installed during the eighteenth and early nineteenth centuries, giving the church a very different appearance from today. These features were removed during the extensive restoration in 1865–67, under the direction of Sir George Gilbert Scott. The rood screen was reconstructed by John Oldrid Scott in 1875 and incorporates parts of the fifteenth-century screen.

The twentieth-century additions included four modern stained glass windows, the decoration of the chancel ceiling by Stephen Dykes Bower, rebuilding and re-siting the organ, the shop and visitor centre, and a vestry on the south side of the chancel.

In 2013 the main entrance was relocated to the west door and an internal glazed porch was fitted. At the same time, a new stone floor was laid and the steps were removed from the font. In 2017 a servery was installed at the west end of the nave.

The stipend for the Vicar of Spalding is paid by the Spalding Rectory Feoffees, a charity established on 1 March 1620.

== Gallery ==
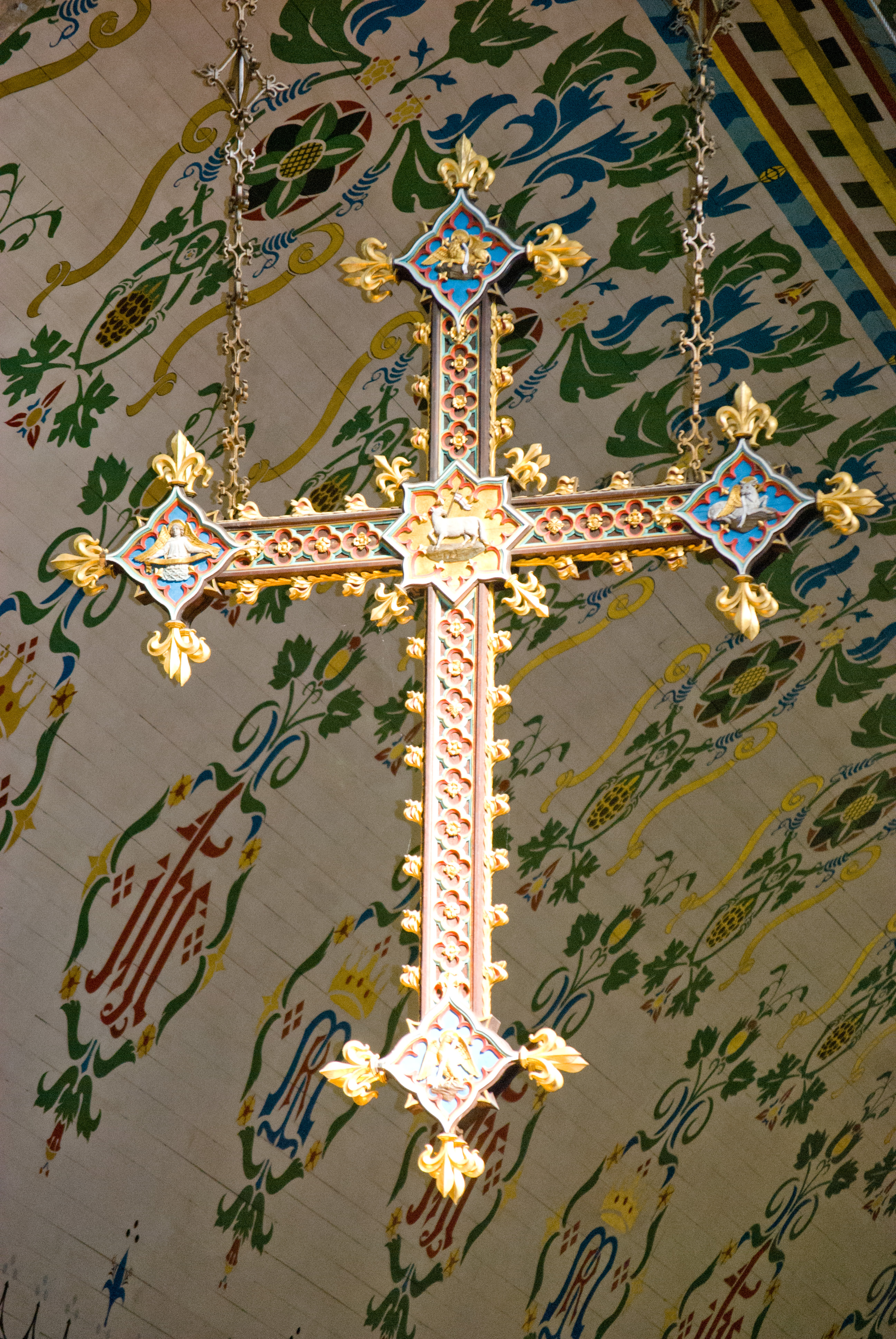
Chancel cross

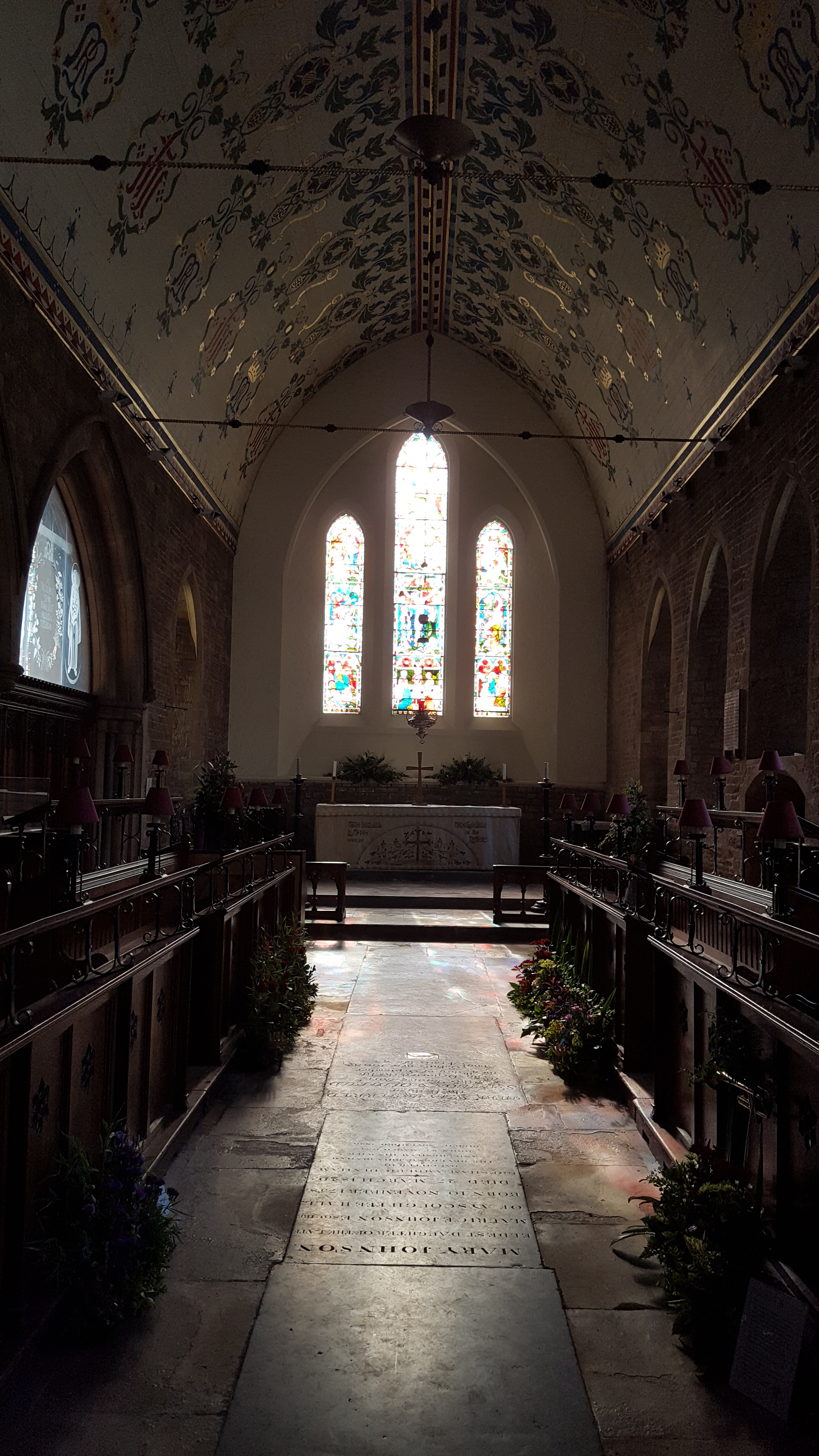
Chancel

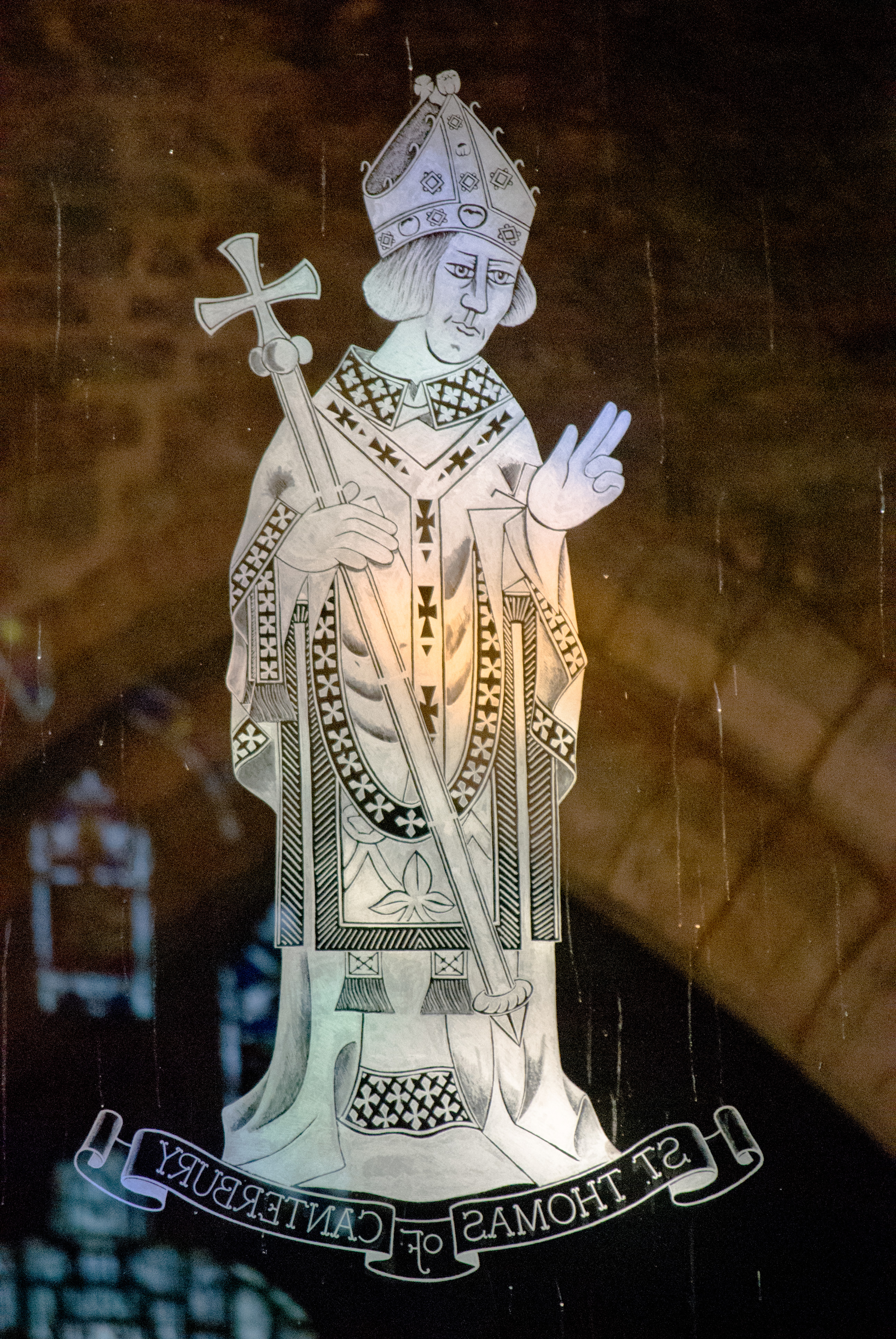
Engraving of St Thomas Becket

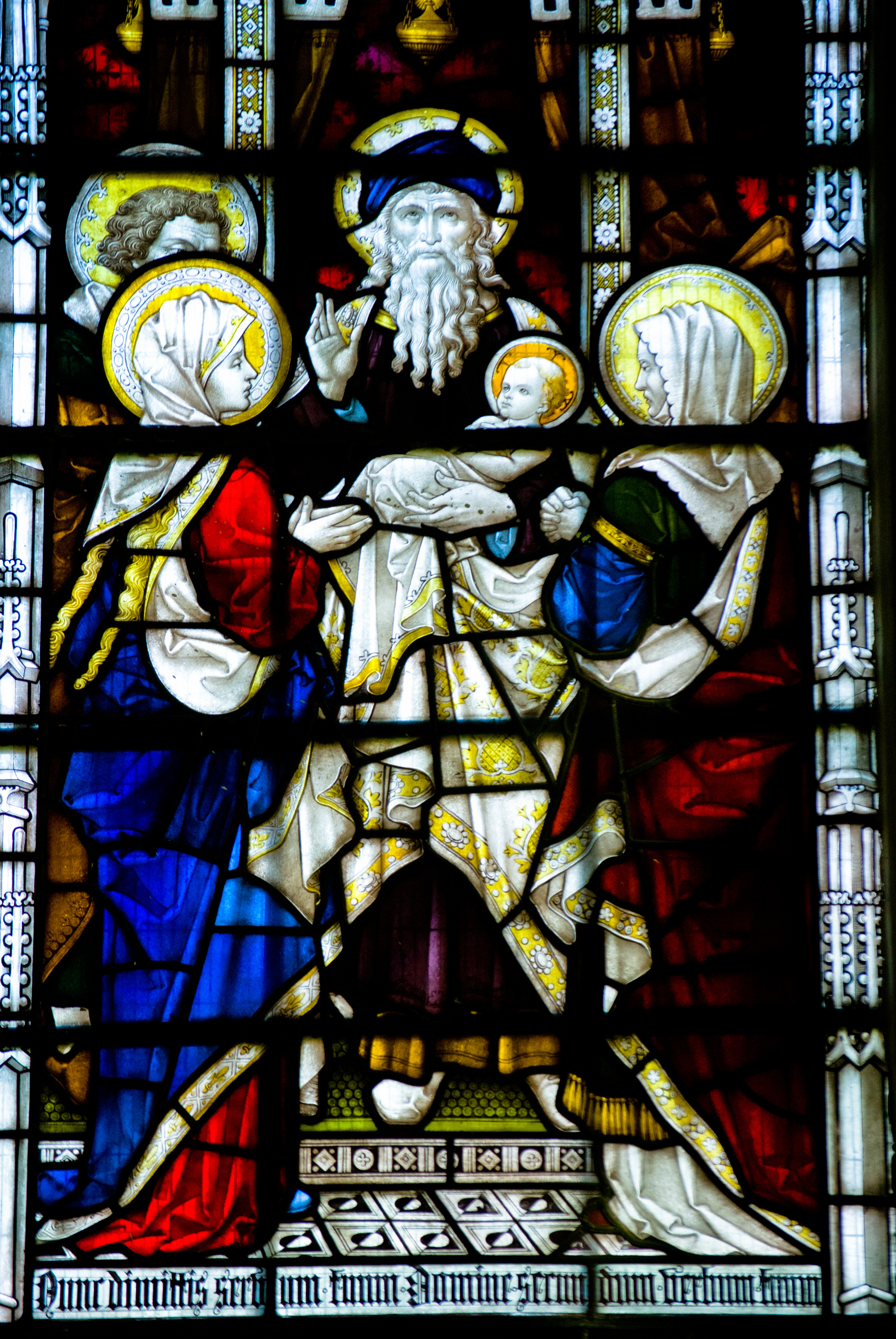
Candlemas

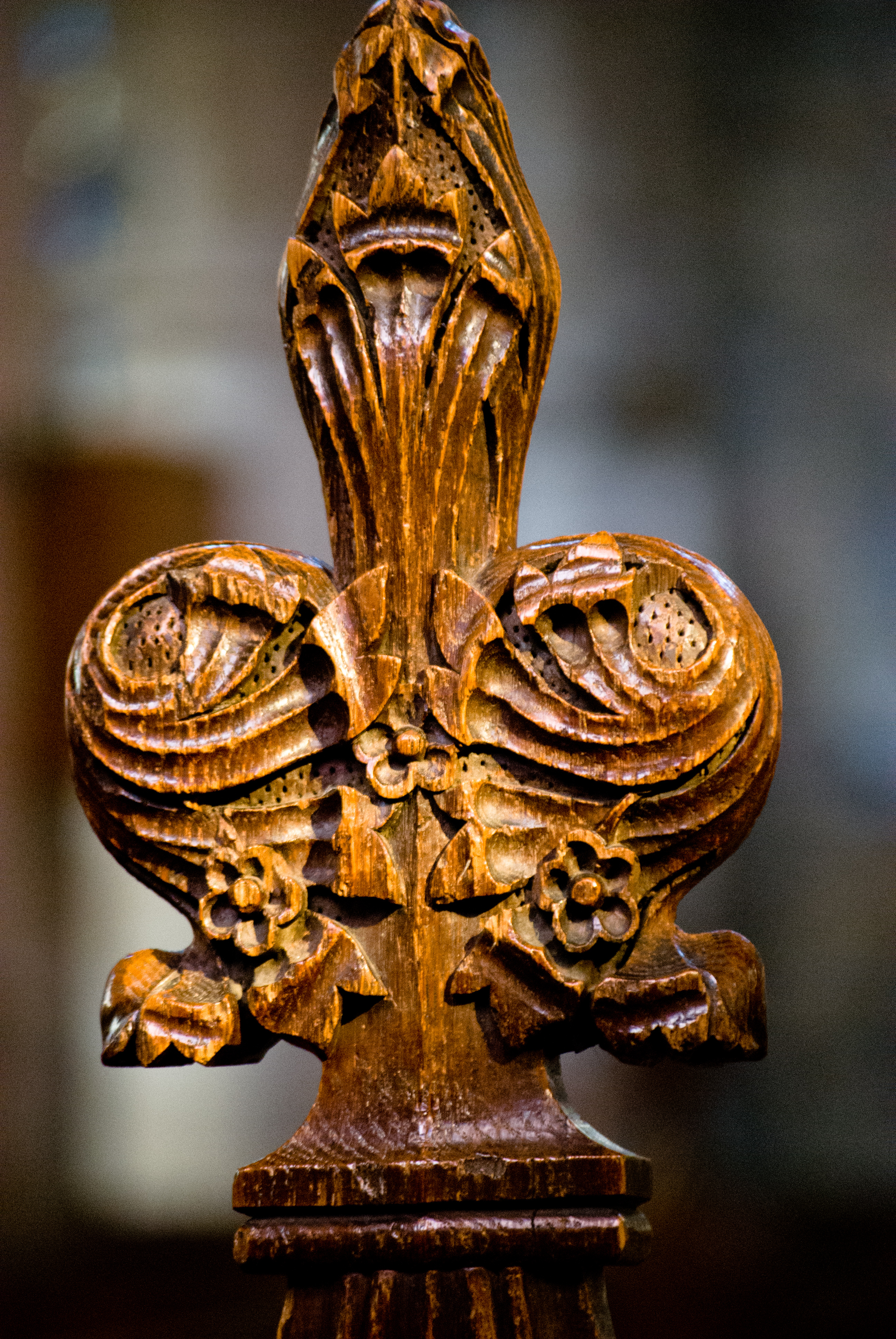
Poppy head pew end

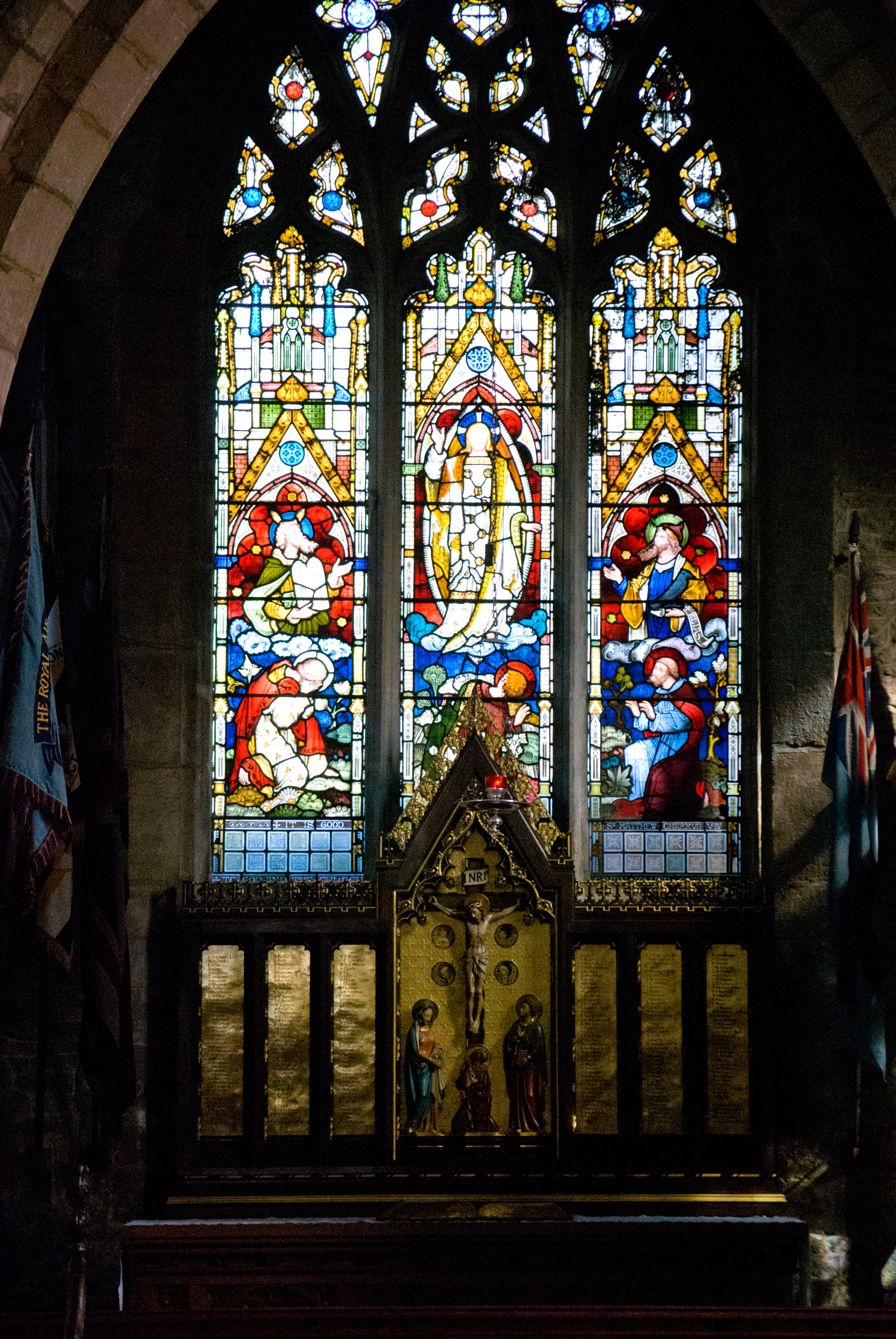
St George's Chapel

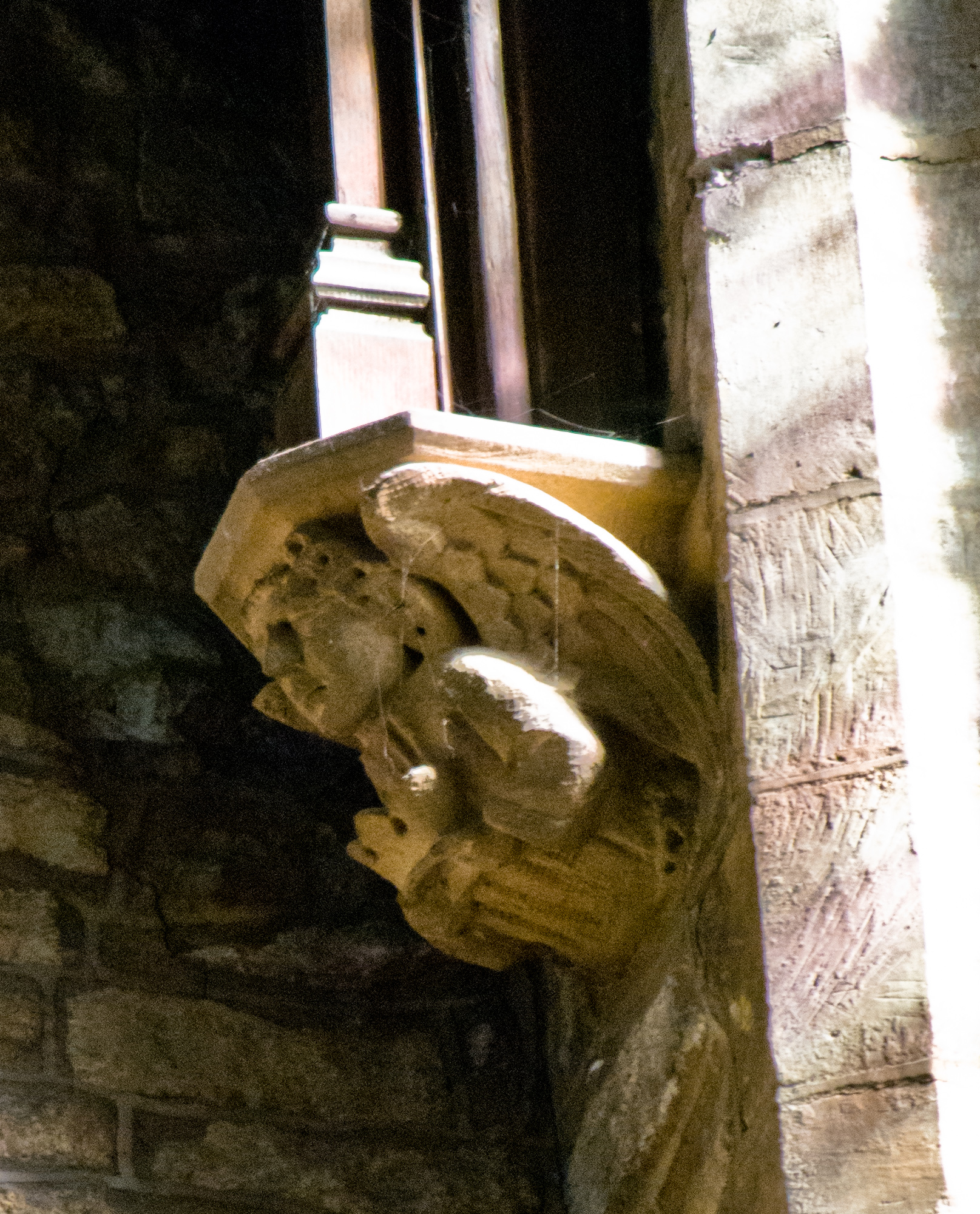
Angel corbel

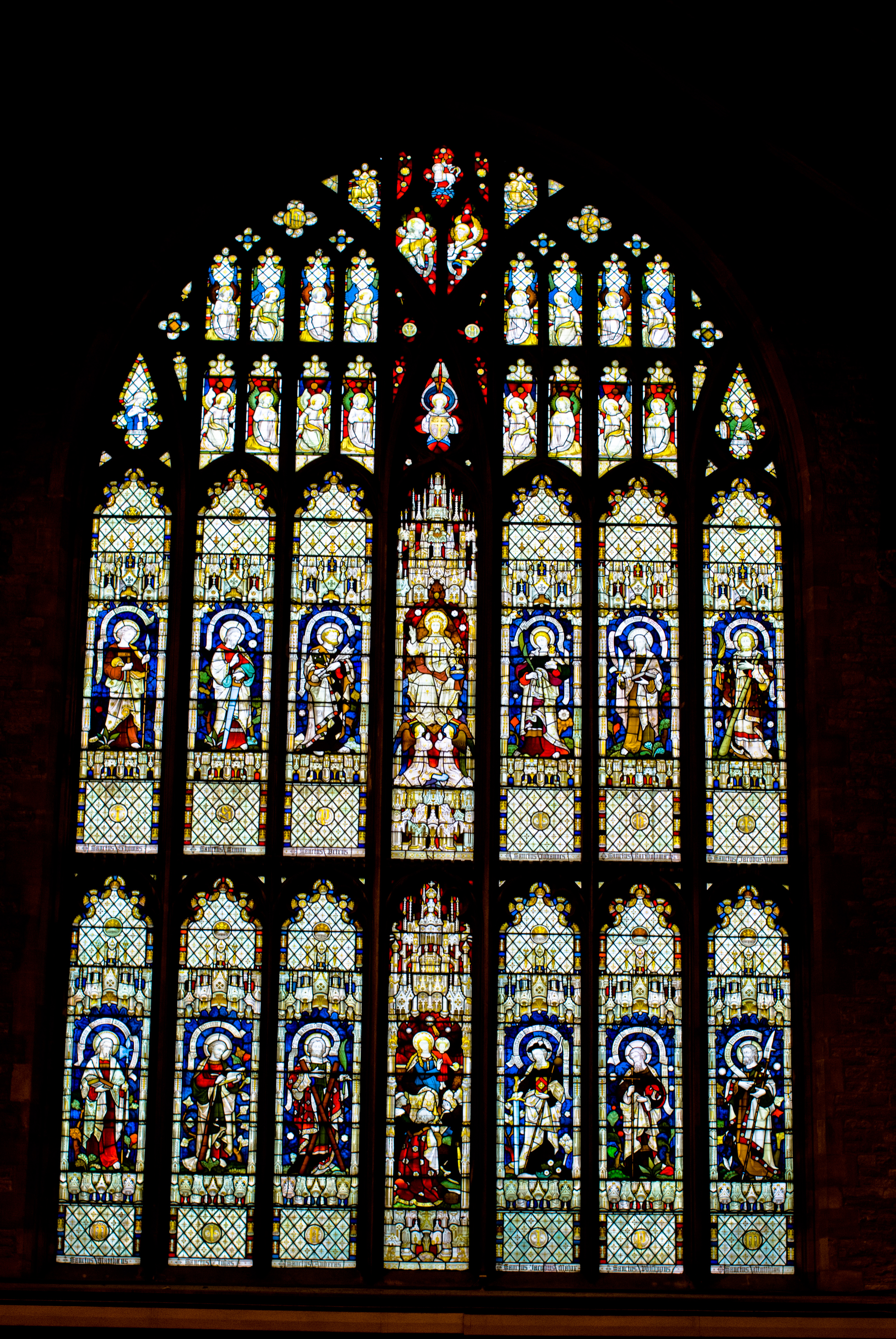
West window

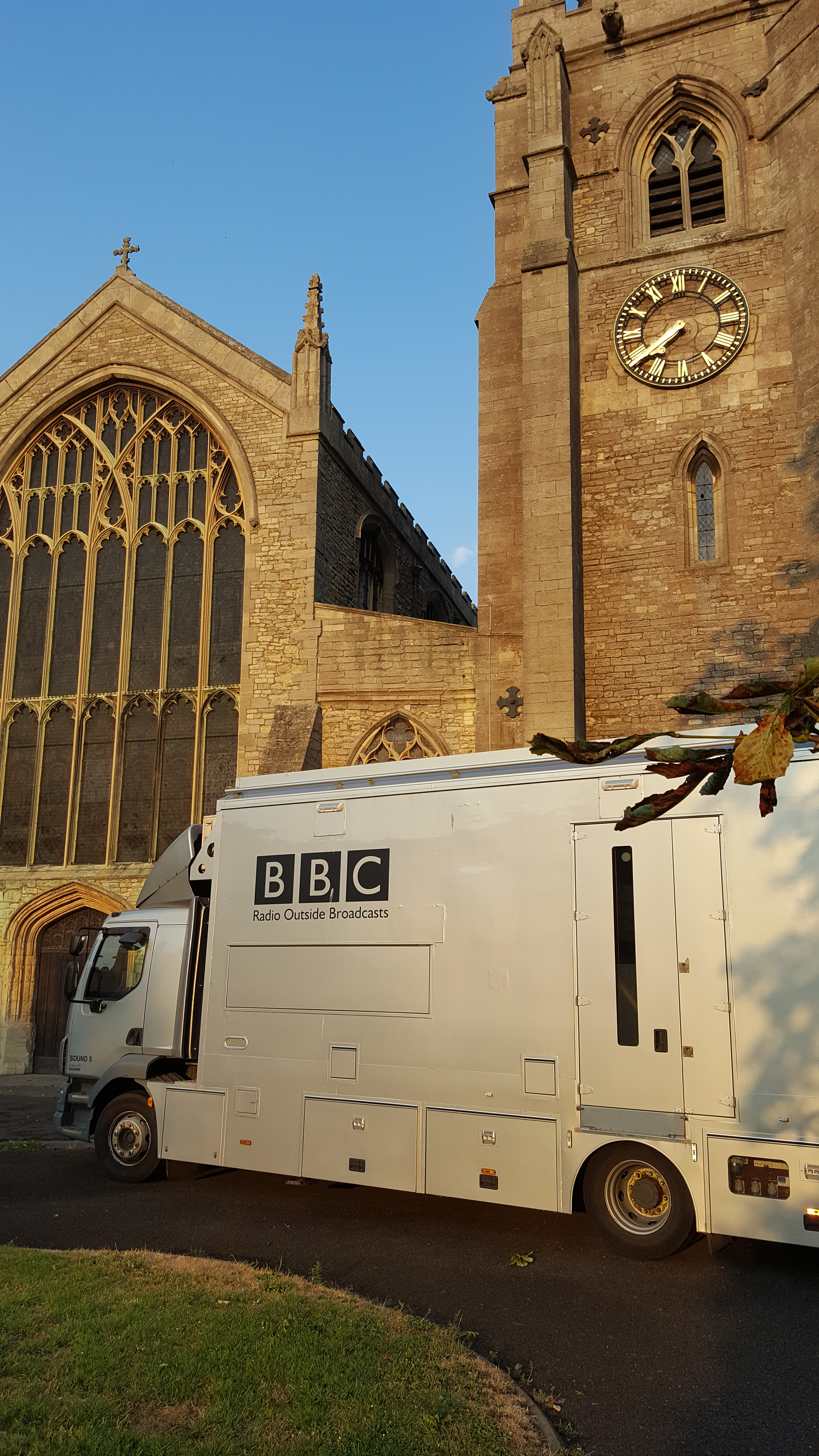
BBC outside broadcast van at the West front

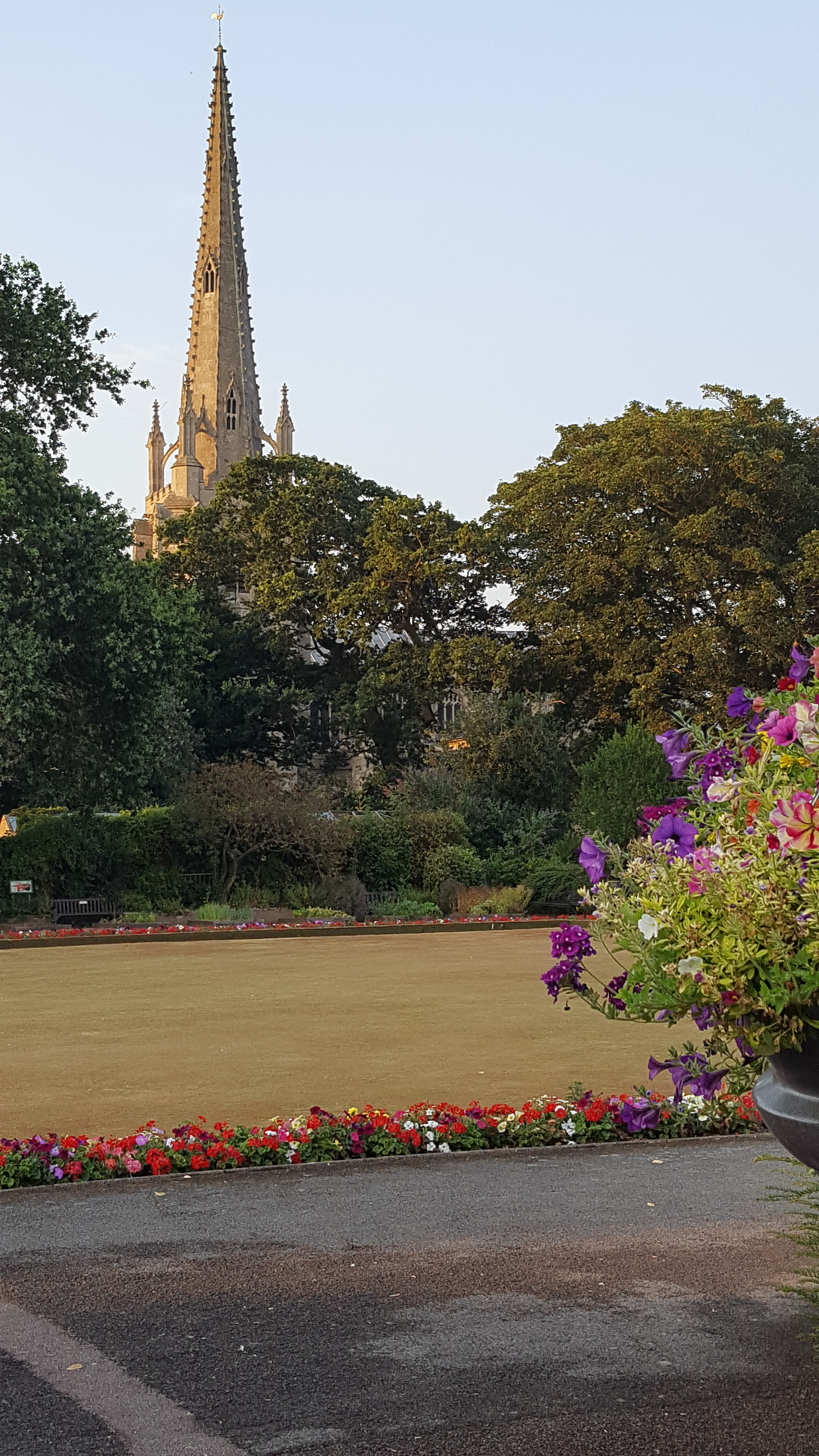
View from Ayscoughfee
