= St Mary Magdalene Church, Gedney =

Coordinates: 52.7985°N 0.0792°E

St Mary Magdalene Church
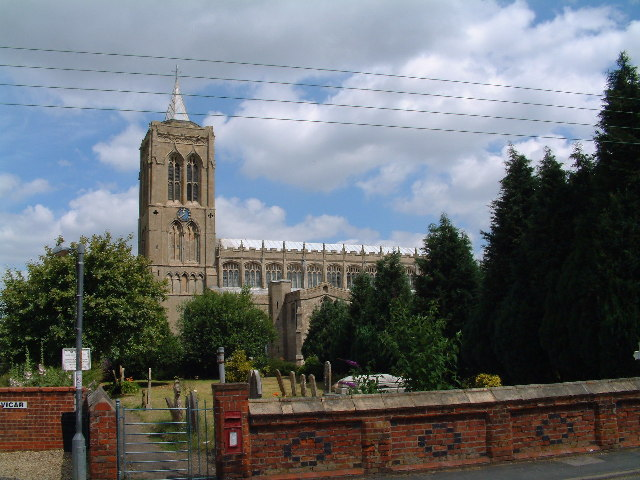
- View from Church End
- St Mary Magdalene Church
- Denomination: Church of England

History
- Dedication: Mary Magdalene

Administration
- Province: Canterbury
- Diocese: Lincoln

St Mary Magdalene Church is an Anglican parish church of medieval origin in Gedney, Lincolnshire. Renowned for its large size in the surrounding low-lying landscape, it is commonly known as the Cathedral of the Fens. It is a Grade I listed building.

The church is dedicated to St Mary Magdalene. Originating in the 13th century, additions and alterations were carried on into the 17th. It was considerably restored in 1890 however the spire to the tower was unfinished and left as a stump. The tower, 86 feet to its parapet, has Early English lower stages and Perpendicular upper. The nave arcades and the chancel are of Decorated style. During the rebuilding of the south aisle in 1890 a brass of a female (ca. 1390), with a puppy at her feet, was discovered. Also in the south aisle is a damaged 13th century effigy of a cross-legged knight, conjectured to represent Falco D'Oyry, and Jacobean alabaster monuments of Adlard Welby, his wife Cassandra and their five children, erected in 1605. The south porch has an upper chamber. At the east end of the north aisle are the remains of a 14th-century Jesse window.

The churchyard contains the war grave of a Lincolnshire Regiment soldier of the First World War.

== Vicars ==
- John Barnard (biographer)
- Adam Loftus (bishop)
- Richard Hakluyt

== Church damage ==
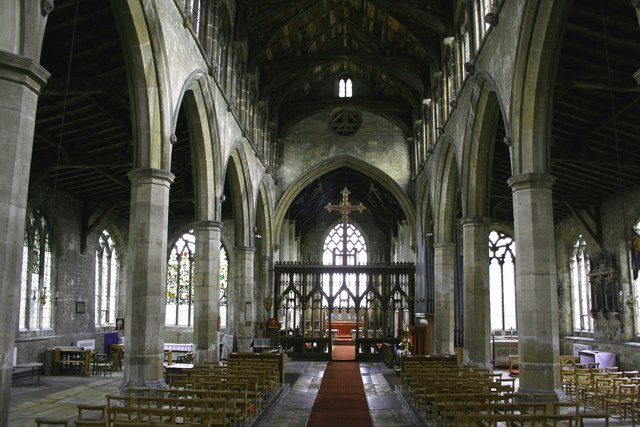
Nave interior

In 2006, 29 windows in the church were smashed, including the Jesse window; vestments and an altar cloth were also set alight, but luckily the fire did not take hold. A 15-year-old and a 16-year-old were interviewed by police and admitted causing the damage.
