= The Moultons =

Civil parish in Lincolnshire, England

Coordinates: 52.798°N 0.063°W

- Civil parish
- Moulton Seas End village sign Moulton Chapel Mill High Street, Moulton

- Location within Lincolnshire
- Interactive map of The Moultons
- Area: 18.78 sq mi (48.6 km^{2})
- Population: 3,681 (2021)
  - Density: 196/sq mi (76/km^{2})
- OS grid reference: TF306240
- District: South Holland
- Shire county: Lincolnshire
- Region: East Midlands
- Country: England
- Sovereign state: United Kingdom
- Settlements: Moulton; Moulton Chapel; Moulton Eaugate; Moulton Seas End; Austendike; Loosegate
- Post town: SPALDING
- Postcode district: PE12
- Dialling code: 01406
- Police: Lincolnshire
- Fire: Lincolnshire
- Ambulance: East Midlands
- UK Parliament: South Holland and The Deepings
- Website: moultons.parish.lincolnshire.gov.uk

The Moultons is a civil parish in the South Holland district of Lincolnshire, England. It comprises the villages and hamlets of Moulton, Moulton Chapel, Moulton Seas End, Moulton Eaugate, Austendike and Loosegate. The parish is an extensive Fenland area, over 16 miles (26 km) in length, situated approximately 5 miles (8.0 km) east of Spalding and 3.5 miles (5.6 km) west of Holbeach. At the 2021 census, the parish had a population of 3,681.

== Geography ==
The Moultons lies in the flat, low-lying agricultural landscape of the Lincolnshire Fens, near the mouth of The Wash, an area designated as a Site of Special Scientific Interest (SSSI) noted for migrating birds and wild flowers. The parish borders Cambridgeshire and Norfolk and is characterised by arable farmland. Elevations are generally low, around 5 to 7 metres (16 to 23 ft) above sea level. The nearest larger town is Spalding, about 7 miles (11 km) to the west, which provides rail links.

Access is primarily via the A151 and B1537 roads. The main village of Moulton is centred around a village green, with surrounding settlements distributed along the elongated north–south parish boundary.

== History ==
=== Toponymy ===
The name Moulton (historically Multon or Multune) derives from Old English *Mūla-tūn*, meaning the settlement or enclosure associated with a person named Mūla, or possibly a place where mules were kept. It appears in the Domesday Book of 1086 as *Multune*.

=== Events ===
The area was recorded in the Domesday Book under the ownership of Ivo Taillebois and Guy de Craon. The village is traditionally said to have developed around 1100 under the influence of the de Multon (or de Moulton) family, who held a moated mansion (King's Hall). Thomas de Multon was a significant local landowner and royal official in the early 13th century.

Moulton Grammar School was founded in 1562 through an endowment in the will of John Harrox (d. 1561), steward to Sir John Harrington. It educated boys until 1939, when it merged with Spalding Grammar School. The Moulton Harrox Educational Foundation continues to support local education from income generated by land holdings.

Moulton railway station, on the former Spalding to Holbeach line, closed to passengers in 1959. A mini-tornado struck the village on 28 July 2005, damaging the church roof and nearby properties as part of a broader outbreak that included the Birmingham tornado. The civil parish was renamed from "Moulton" to "The Moultons" on 3 May 2016. In July 2016, residents of Moulton were involved in a shooting incident in nearby Spalding.

=== Houses of worship ===
All Saints' Church, known as "The Queen of the Fens", dates from about 1180, initiated by Prior John of Spalding. Construction took approximately 60–70 years; it was heavily restored in 1866–1867 by William Smith. The church features a 15th-century rood screen, a tall slender spire of 158 feet (48 m), and is Grade I listed. An unusual memorial records the death of Prudence Corby on "Julye the 36th 1793".

An octagonal chapel of ease (Chapel of St James) was built at Moulton Chapel in 1722 by William Sands Senior of Spalding; it is Grade II* listed. Nonconformist chapels, including Wesleyan and Primitive Methodist, have historically served the parish.

== Governance ==
The Moultons is administered by The Moultons Parish Council. It falls within the South Holland district of Lincolnshire and the parliamentary constituency of South Holland and The Deepings. The parish is within the wider Moulton, Weston and Cowbit ward.

== Demographics ==
At the 2021 census, the civil parish recorded a population of 3,681. Earlier figures include 3,073 (2001) and 3,504 (2011). Approximate village populations (parish council estimates) are around 2,000 in Moulton, 950 in Moulton Chapel, and 850 in Moulton Seas End.

Historical population
Year	2001	2011	2021
Population	3,073	3,504	3,681

== Economy ==
Agriculture dominates the local economy, with extensive arable farmland typical of the Fens. The parish supports local services including shops, public houses, a medical centre, post office, butchers, and schools. Light industry and community facilities, such as village halls and sports clubs, are present in the main settlements.

== Community ==
Moulton features a village green, medical centre and pharmacy, The Swan public house, post office and village shop, butcher, fish and chip shop, hairdressers, school, community centre, village hall, and Moulton Harrox Sports Club. Moulton Chapel has a church, chapel, youth and community centre, shops, school, hairdresser, and two public houses (The Wheatsheaf and The Jolly Farmer). Moulton Seas End has a village hall, playing field, public house, and play area.

Larger retail, secondary education, and broader services are accessed in Spalding or Holbeach.

== Landmarks ==
=== Listed buildings ===
The parish contains two Grade I listed buildings, one Grade II* listed building, and approximately 25 Grade II listed buildings, together with one scheduled monument.

==== Grade I ====
- All Saints' Church at Moulton village: Grade I listed medieval parish church known as the "Queen of the Fens". Medieval parish church begun c. 1180.
- Moulton Windmill: Grade I listed tower mill built c. 1822 by Robert King. The tallest tower mill in the United Kingdom (approximately 80 feet / 24 m to the curb). It lost its sails in 1895, continued milling under alternative power until 1995, and was restored with new sails fitted in 2011; wind-powered flour production resumed in 2013.

==== Grade II* ====
- Chapel of St James, Roman Road, Moulton Chapel (list entry 1359293): Octagonal chapel of ease of 1722 by William Sands Senior, with 1886 additions.

==== Grade II and scheduled monuments ====
The remaining Grade II listed buildings include a variety of houses, farmhouses, farm buildings, a public house (The Swan), a Methodist chapel, a war memorial, a K6 telephone kiosk, a lychgate, a hand pump, and the smaller windmill at Moulton Chapel. Notable examples include Harrox House, Harrington House, Manor House, Austendike Hall, Seasend Hall, and Snake Hall.

Moulton Castle (King's Hall): Scheduled ancient monument comprising the earthwork remains of a 12th–14th-century moated site, believed to have been the residence of the de Moulton family.

=== Other sites ===
The Elloe Stone: Nearby marker believed to indicate the site of the Elloe wapentake moot in the Danish period.

== Notable people ==
- G. D'Arcy Boulton (1759–1834), lawyer, judge and politician in Upper Canada.
- John Molson (1763–1836), founder of the Molson brewing company in Canada.
- Johnny Douglas (1882–1930), Olympic boxing gold medallist and England cricket captain (attended Moulton Grammar School).
- Rev Kenneth Healey, Bishop of Grimsby 1958–1966 (attended Moulton Grammar School).
- Walter Plowright (1923–2010), veterinary scientist (attended Moulton Grammar School).
- The Rt Hon John Hayes, MP for South Holland and The Deepings, resident of the parish.
