= Whitwell and Reepham railway station =

Railway station in Norfolk, England

Whitwell and Reepham
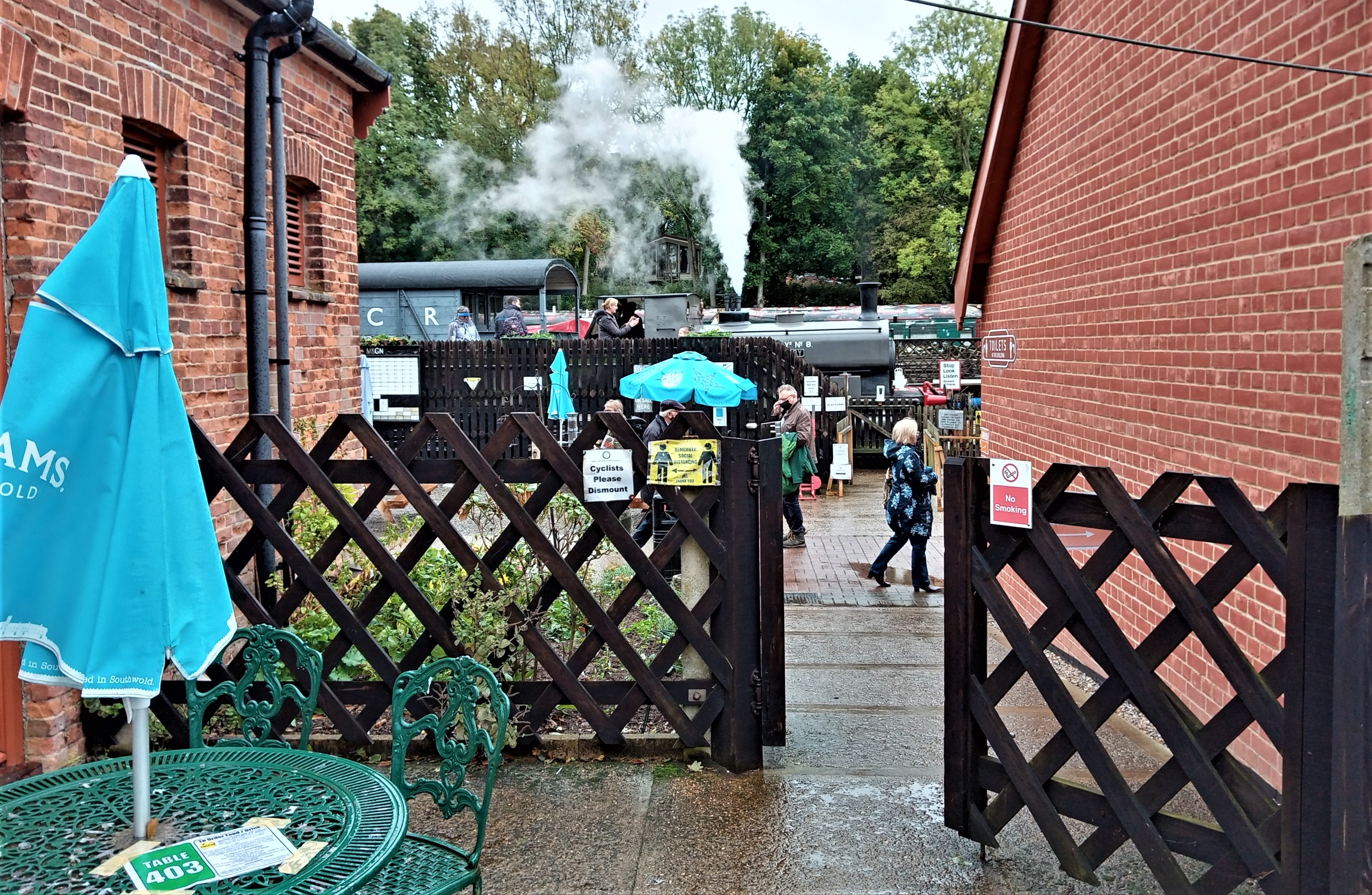
- Station platform in October 2020

General information
- Location: Reepham, Broadland, Norfolk; England
- Coordinates: 52.7517°N 1.0975°E
- Grid reference: TG091217
- System: Station on heritage railway
- Owner: Midland and Great Northern Joint Railway; Eastern Region of British Railways
- Manager: Lynn & Fakenham Railway; Midland and Great Northern Joint Railway
- Platforms: 2

Key dates
- 1 July 1882: Opened
- 28 February 1959: Closed to passengers
- 1 May 1964: Closed to freight
- 28 February 2009: Site reopened to the public
Location

Whitwell and Reepham railway station, also known as Whitwell station, is a former station situated in Norfolk, England. The station closed in 1959 and is a notable stop on the Marriott's Way long-distance footpath. It is being restored as a railway museum, including the re-laying of track.

== History ==
The station was opened in 1882 as part of the Midland and Great Northern Joint Railway's (M&GN) branch from the main line at Melton Constable to Norwich City. Whilst the route was fairly well-used, it struggled under the competition from the larger Great Eastern Railway and its more direct lines. Only one year prior to opening, the Great Eastern had inaugurated its own station at Reepham which, unlike Whitwell, was conveniently sited to the settlement it purported to serve.

The M&GN suffered in the post-Second World War period which saw much freight transfer to road and greater car ownership, leaving the line with its summer and schools traffic. In the face of spiralling losses, British Rail made the decision to close the majority of the line, leaving Whitwell open for freight until 1964. The track through the station remained, however, down until 1985 for the purposes of concrete product movements to neighbouring Lenwade railway station. The station site itself was variously used post-closure as a tree surgery, offices, the parking of coaches and a workshop and garage. Following the lifting of the track through the station, the trackbed was reused as part of the Marriott's Way from 1993.

At one point there was a proposal to dismantle the station building and re-erect it at Holt station on the North Norfolk Railway, but the M&GN station from Stalham was chosen instead.

Preceding station	Disused railways	Following station
Lenwade	Midland and Great Northern; Norwich Branch	Guestwick

== Revival ==
=== Sale of the land by Norfolk County Council ===
After years of lying derelict, the intact station buildings were offered for sale in 2006 for £250,000 by their owners Norfolk County Council. In the event of it failing to sell, the county council had earmarked it as the possible location of a travellers' site. It was, however, acquired by the Wyatts who planned to establish an alpaca colony on the site and applied to Broadland District Council for permission to convert the station into a residence and reuse the goods shed as a workshop and storage area. Councillors approved the application in April 2007 notwithstanding the recommendations of planning officers to refuse it.

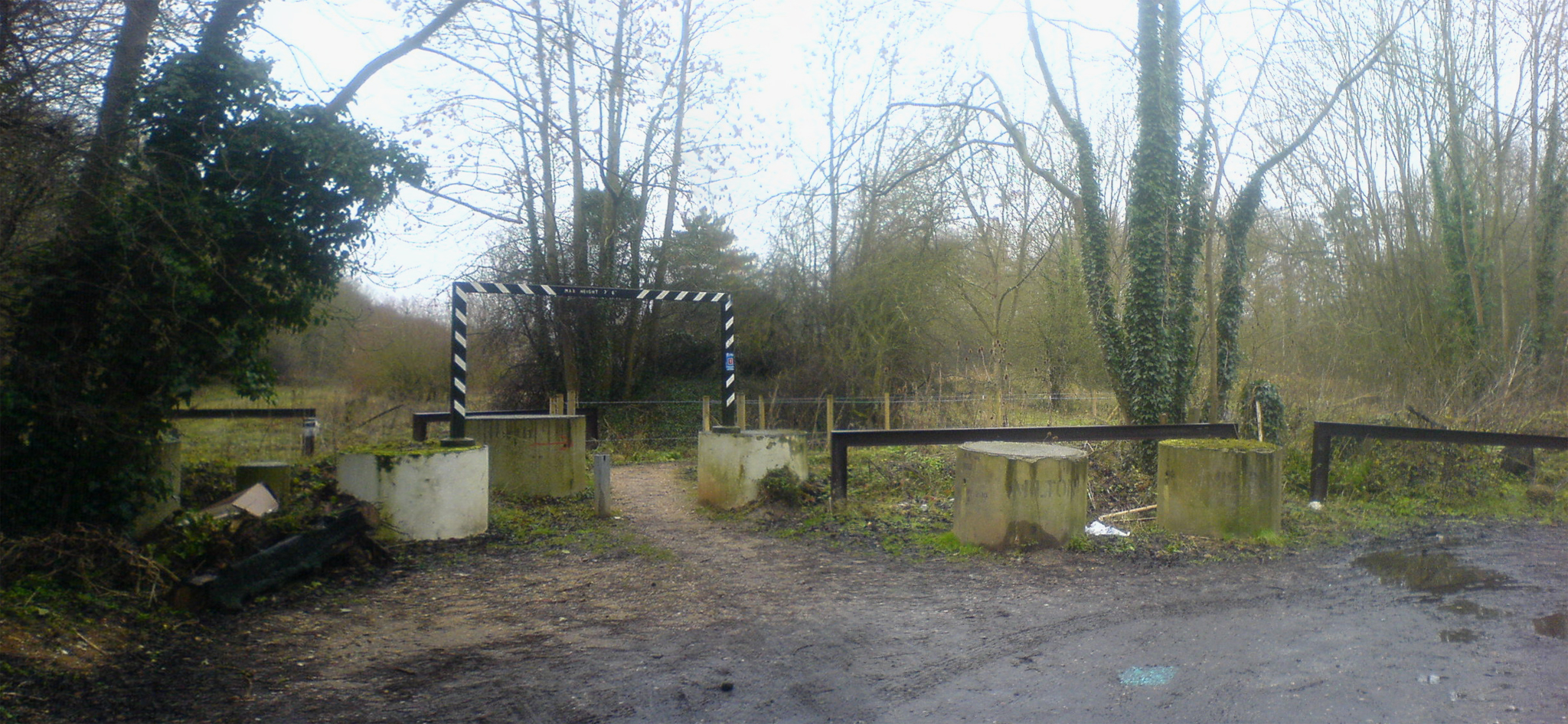
Entrance to Whitwell Station before restoration.

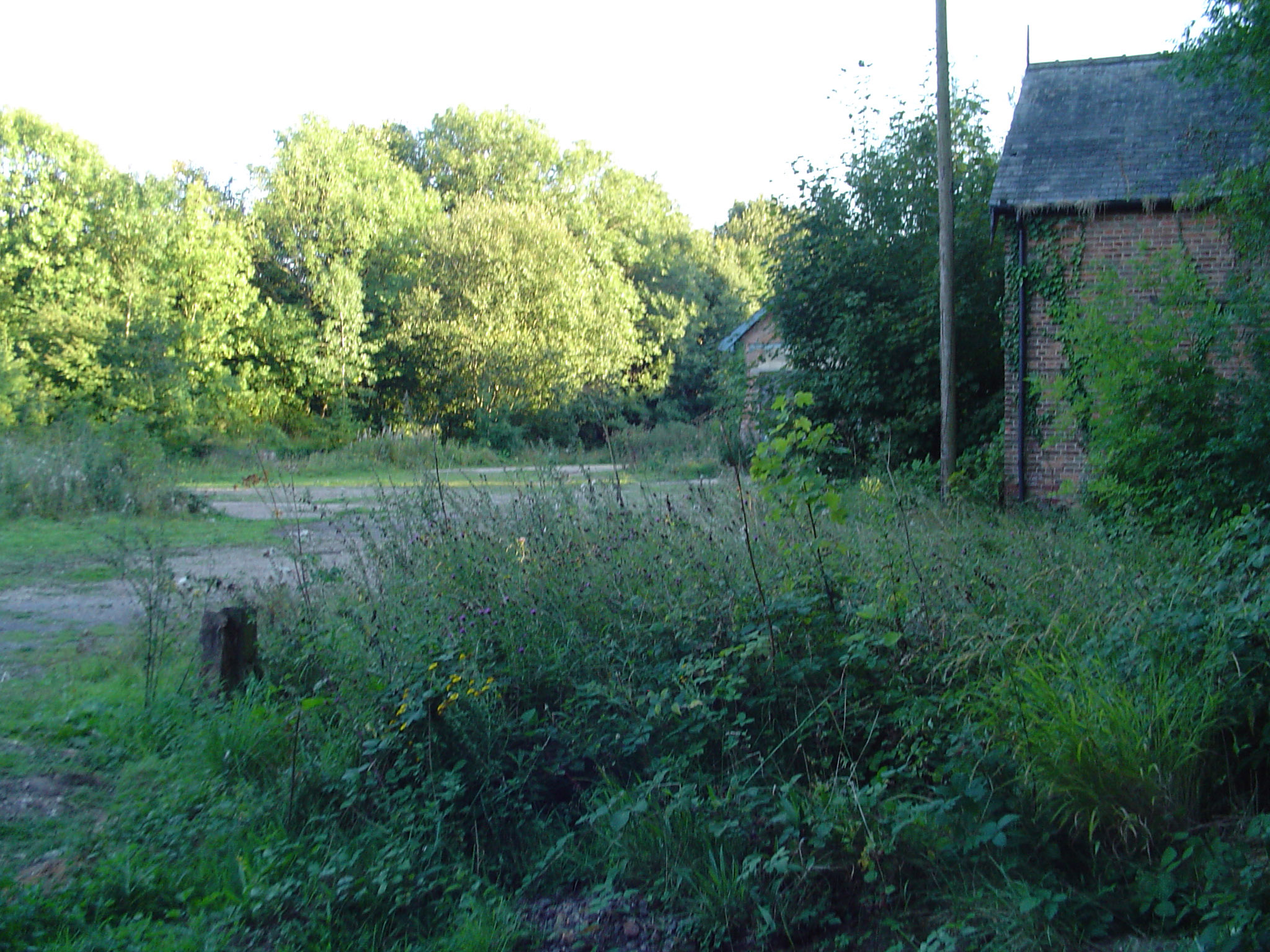
The centre of the Whitwell Station Site; with the goods shed in the centre background, and the rear of the station, front right.

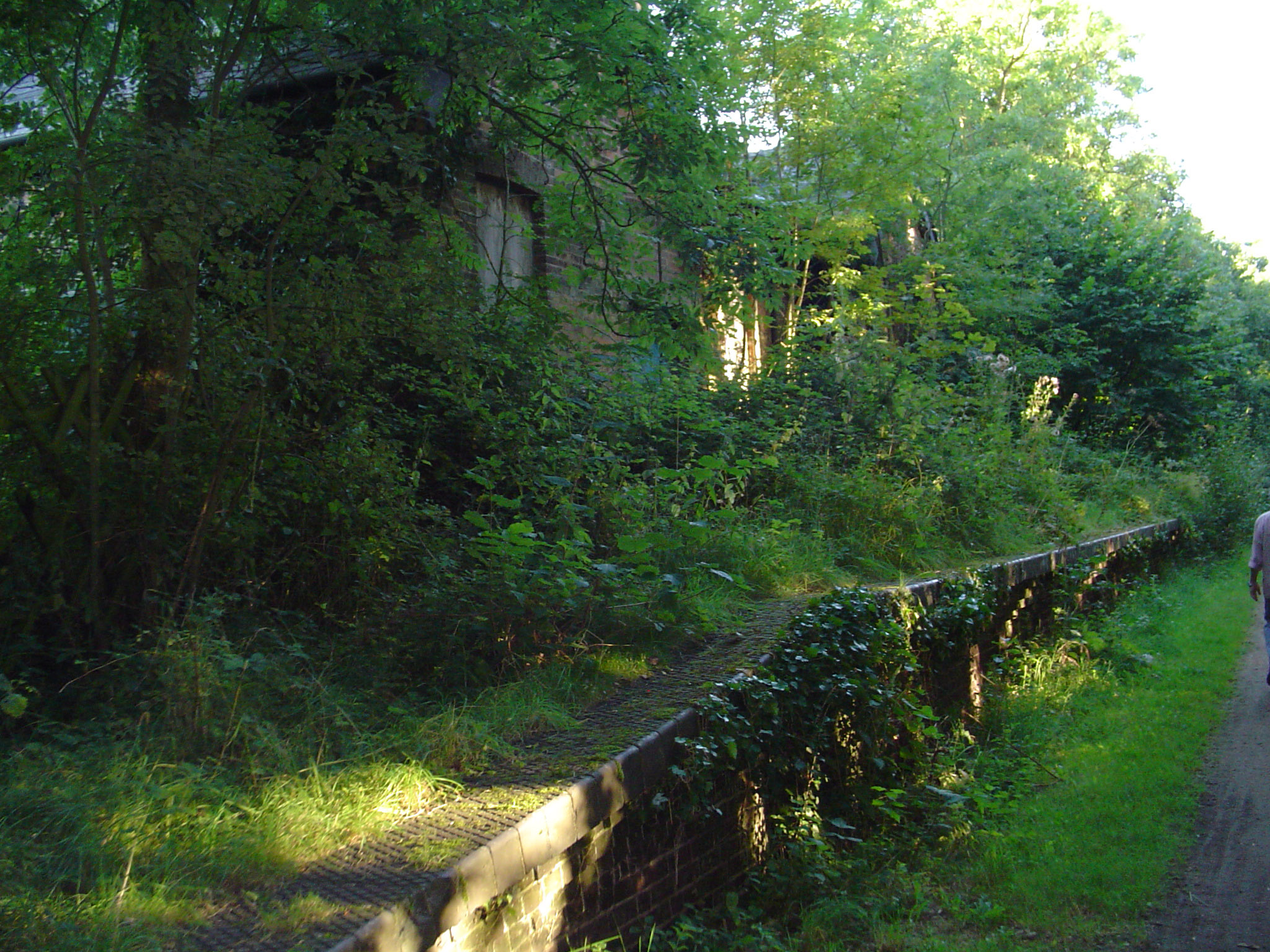
The front platform of Whitwell Station before restoration. Vastly overgrown, and adjacent to the Marriott's Way cycle path.

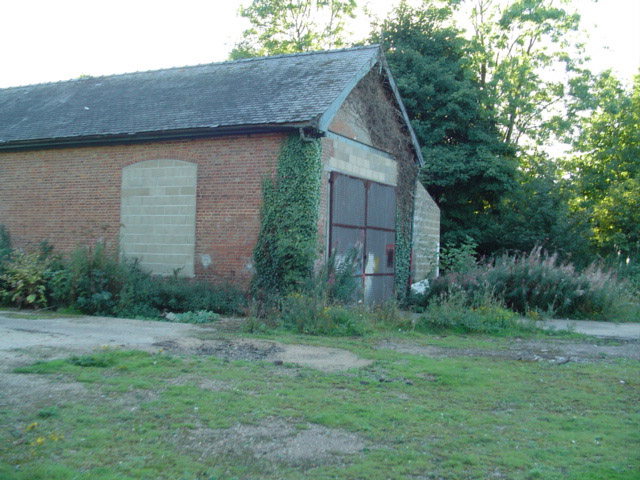
The goods shed of the Whitwell Station site before conversion as a locomotive shed.

=== Acquisition by Mike Urry ===
The station was put back on the market in Summer 2007 at a guide price of £300,000 - £350,000 but failed to attract a buyer. It was purchased in September 2007 by rail enthusiast Mike Urry who planned to restore the station and relay track. The new owner announced his plans on the project's web site, indicating that he intended to establish a small museum on the site.

== Whitwell & Reepham Railway Preservation Society Limited ==
Having formed the Whitwell & Reepham Railway Preservation Society Limited (with 100 members as of November 2008), Mike Urry has planned the project's future in three phases. Phase one involves returning the station to its original layout by re-laying track and restoring the station buildings. Phase two is to extend the line along Marriott's Way to re-create the 7 miles (11 km) Themelthorpe curve to Reepham railway station. Phase three would entail linking up with either the North Norfolk Railway or Mid Norfolk Railway.

By September 2008, 440 feet (130 m) of track (donated by the Spa Valley Railway) had been laid in the yard and to the former goods shed which will serve as the designated engine shed. A Baguley-Drewry diesel shunter, two Mk I coaches, a Bogie 'B' luggage van and a British Rail four-wheel van have already been delivered to the site. In addition, an original M&GN hand crane (from Holbeach station) has been loaned by the North Norfolk Railway. An Andrew Barclay 0-4-0ST was delivered to the site on 23 March 2009.

By May 2010, most of the station-side platform had been resurfaced and the fencing was going up. After being granted £70,000 the goods shed was being renovated with new doors and windows for use as an engine shed. An extra line had been completed along the cattle platform and was serving as storage line for stock.

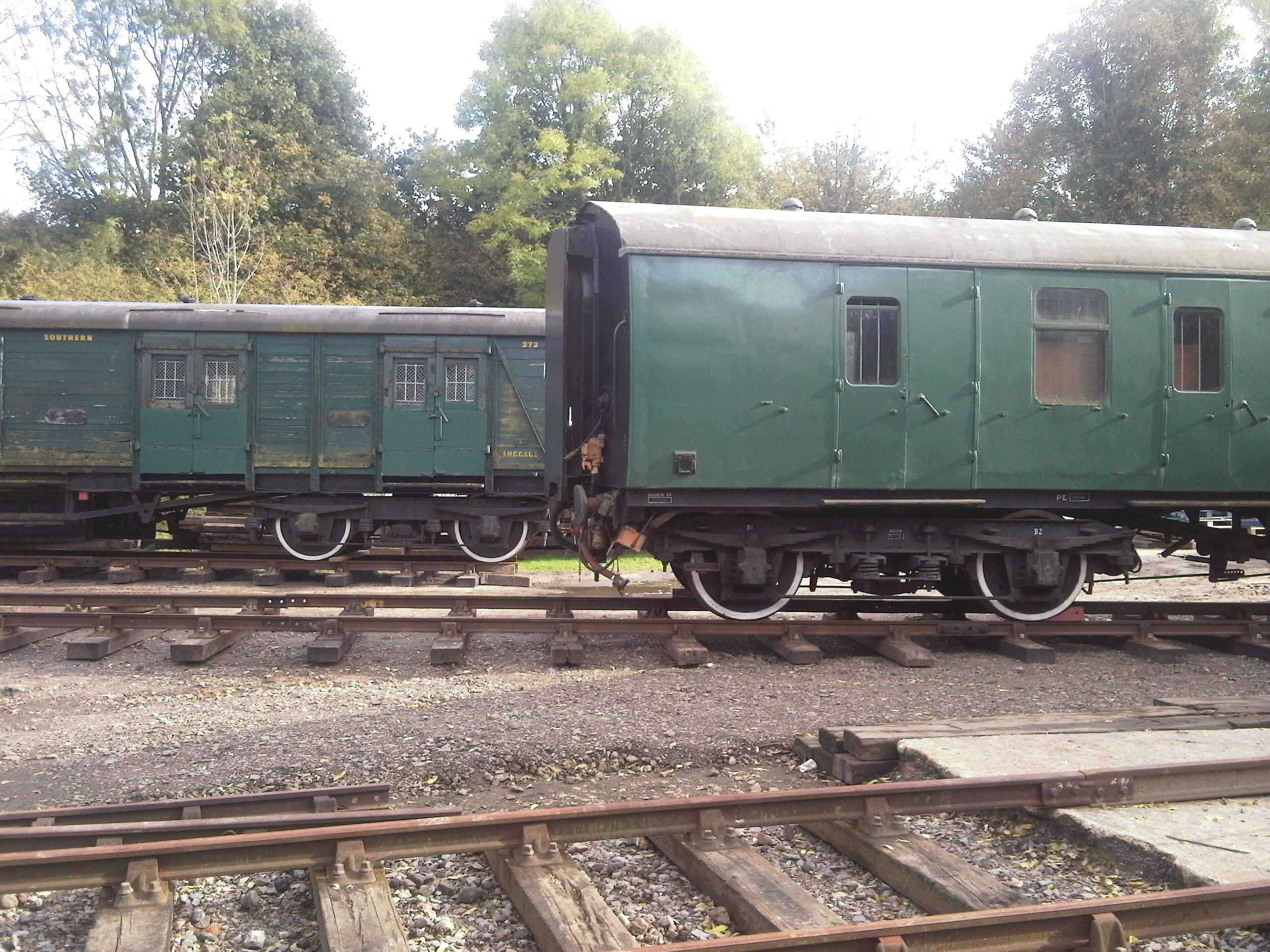
Railway vehicles in the partially relaid yard, October 2008

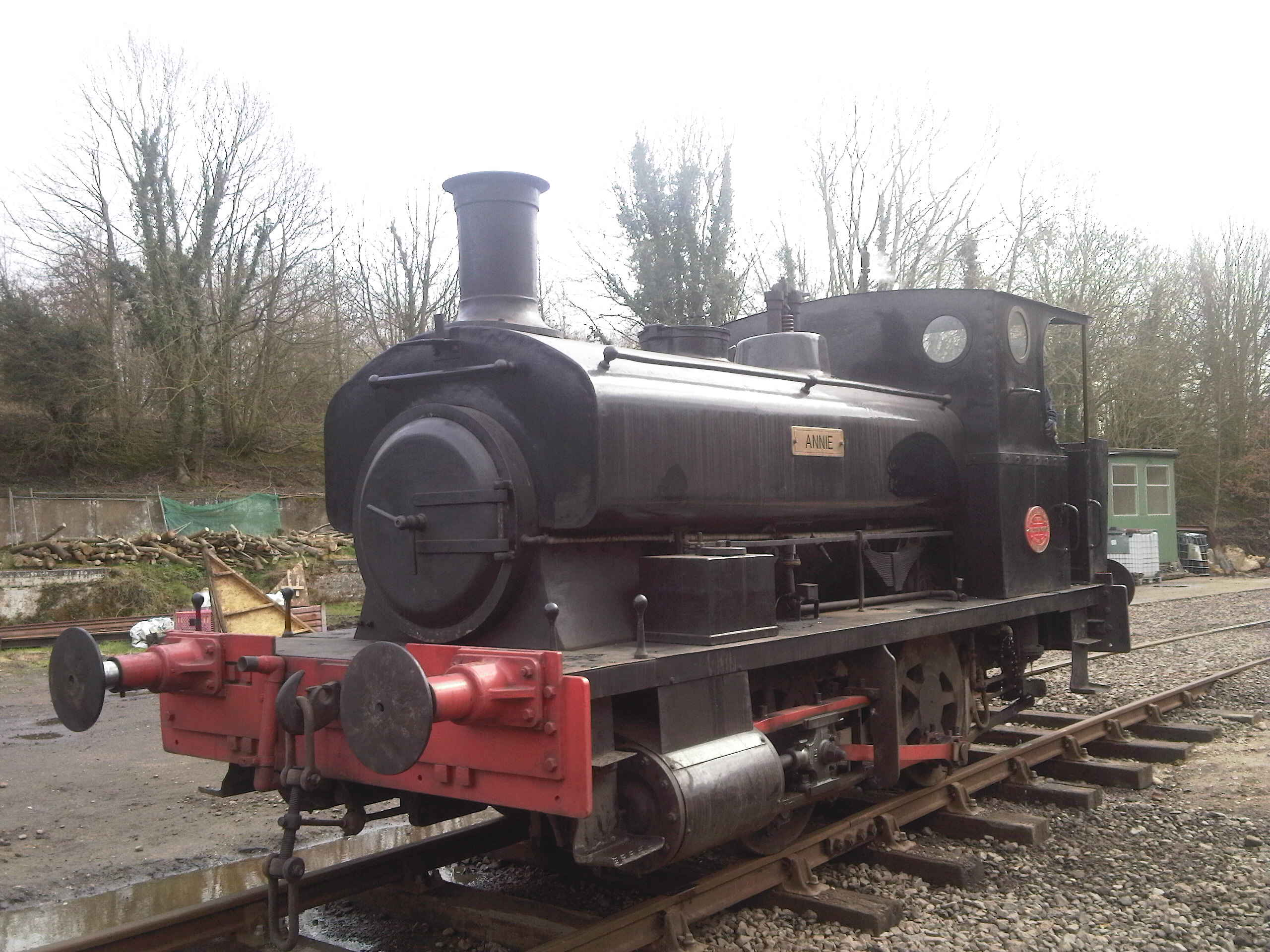
Andrew Barclay 0-4-0ST Annie at Whitwell station, March 2009

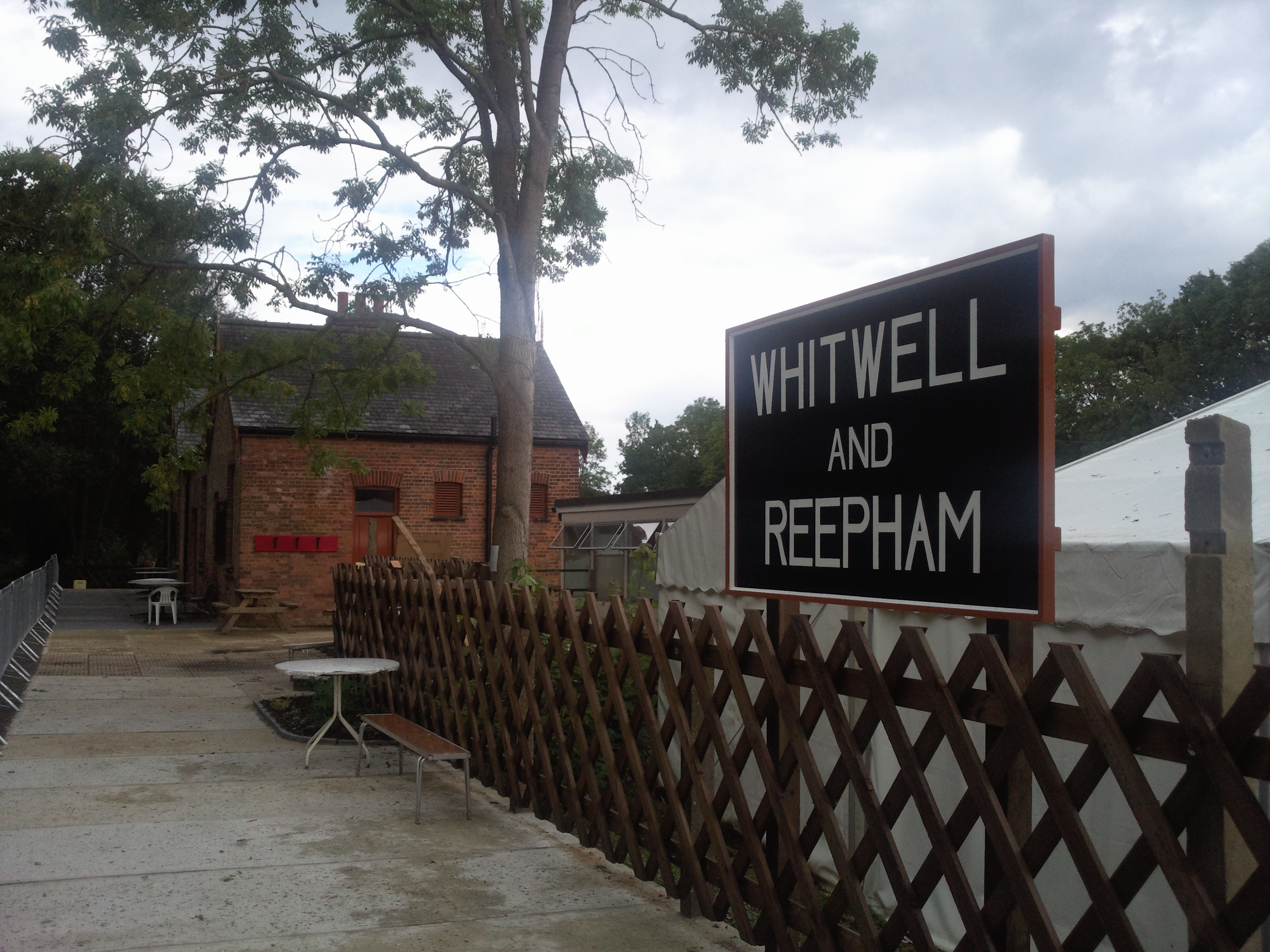
Station running in board on the original platform, 2010

=== Public opening ===
Although restoration efforts were still ongoing, the station saw steam return on 28 February 2009, the 50th anniversary of the closure of the M&GN, when Peckett 0-6-0ST No. 2000 visited from Barrow Hill Roundhouse The line also launched its appeal for £20,000 to finance a new steam engine for the railway. It is estimated that 6000 turned up over the two weekends of the gala. A reunion of former users of the line also took place.

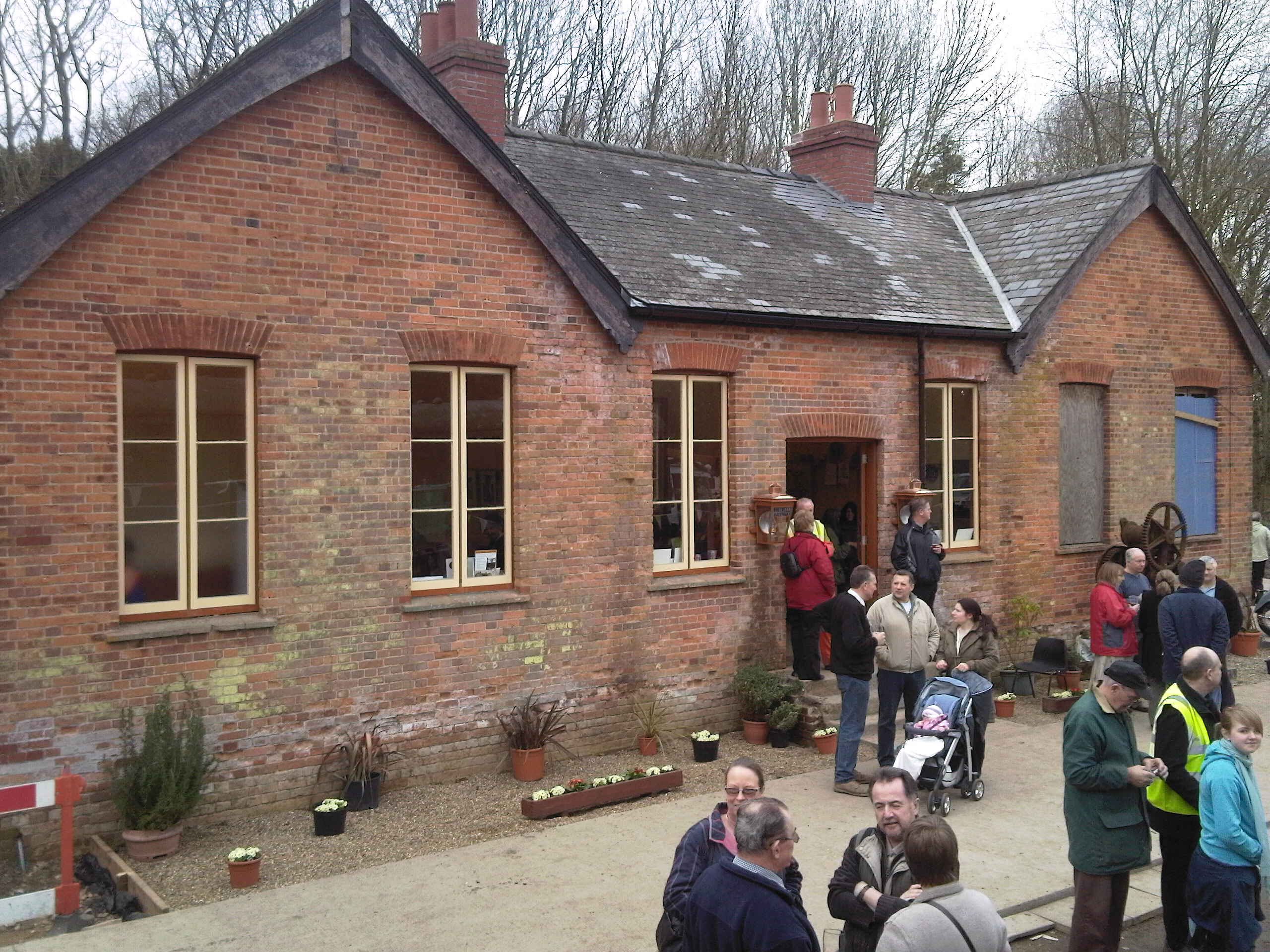
Whitwell station sees its first customers since closure in 1959

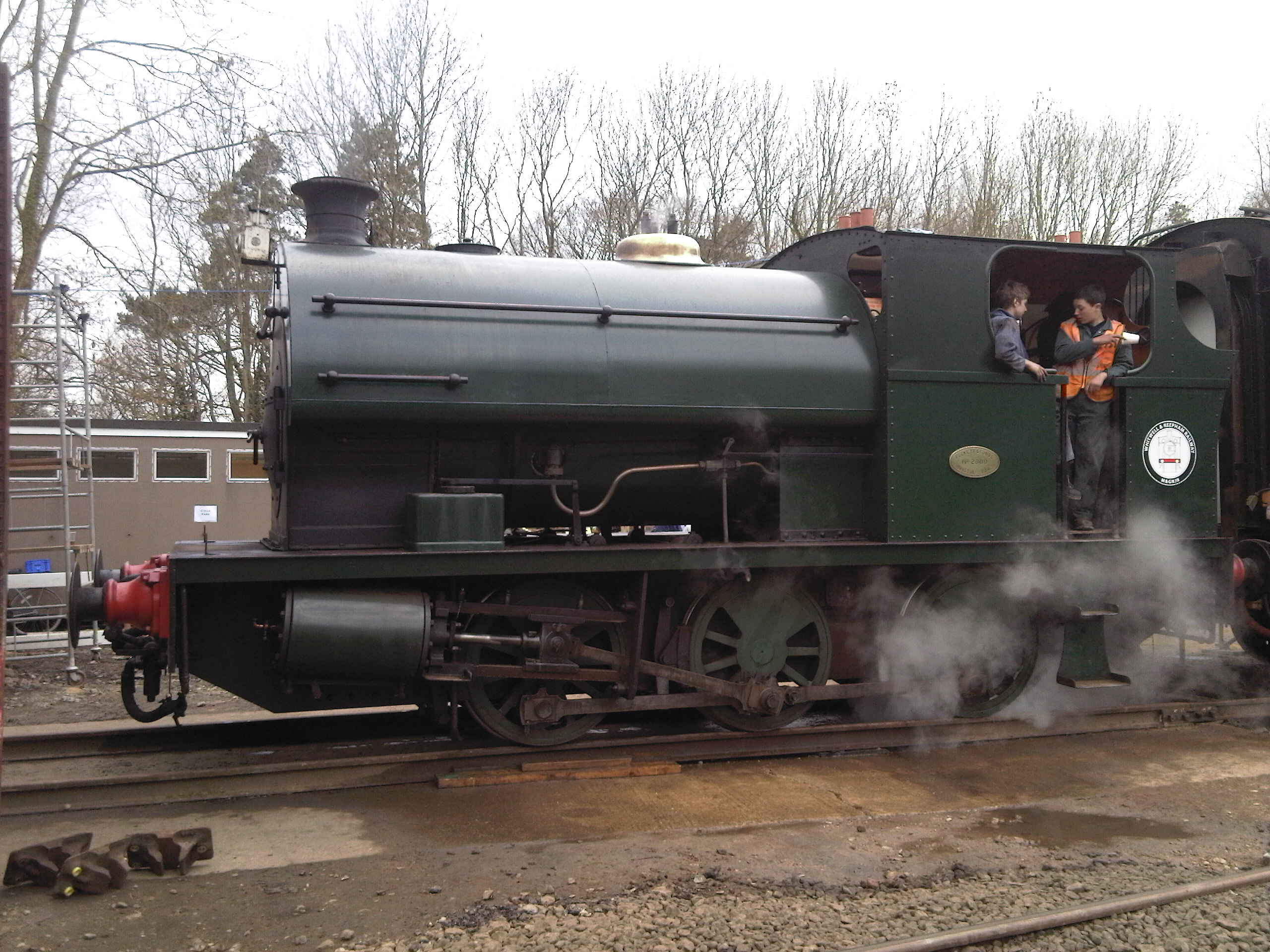
Peckett 2000, branded for the W&RR

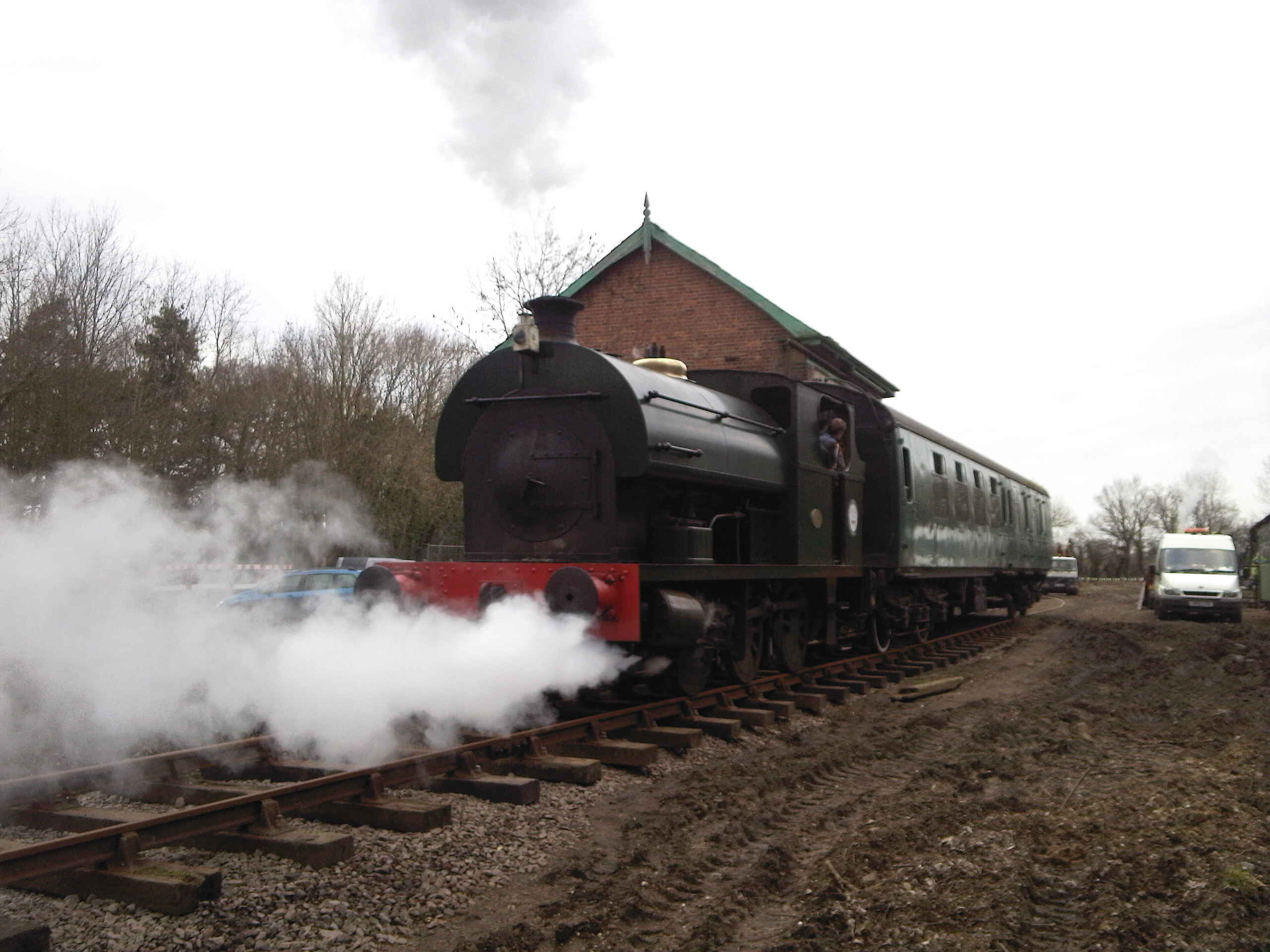
The Peckett and passenger coach passes the goods shed during the Whitwell station reopening

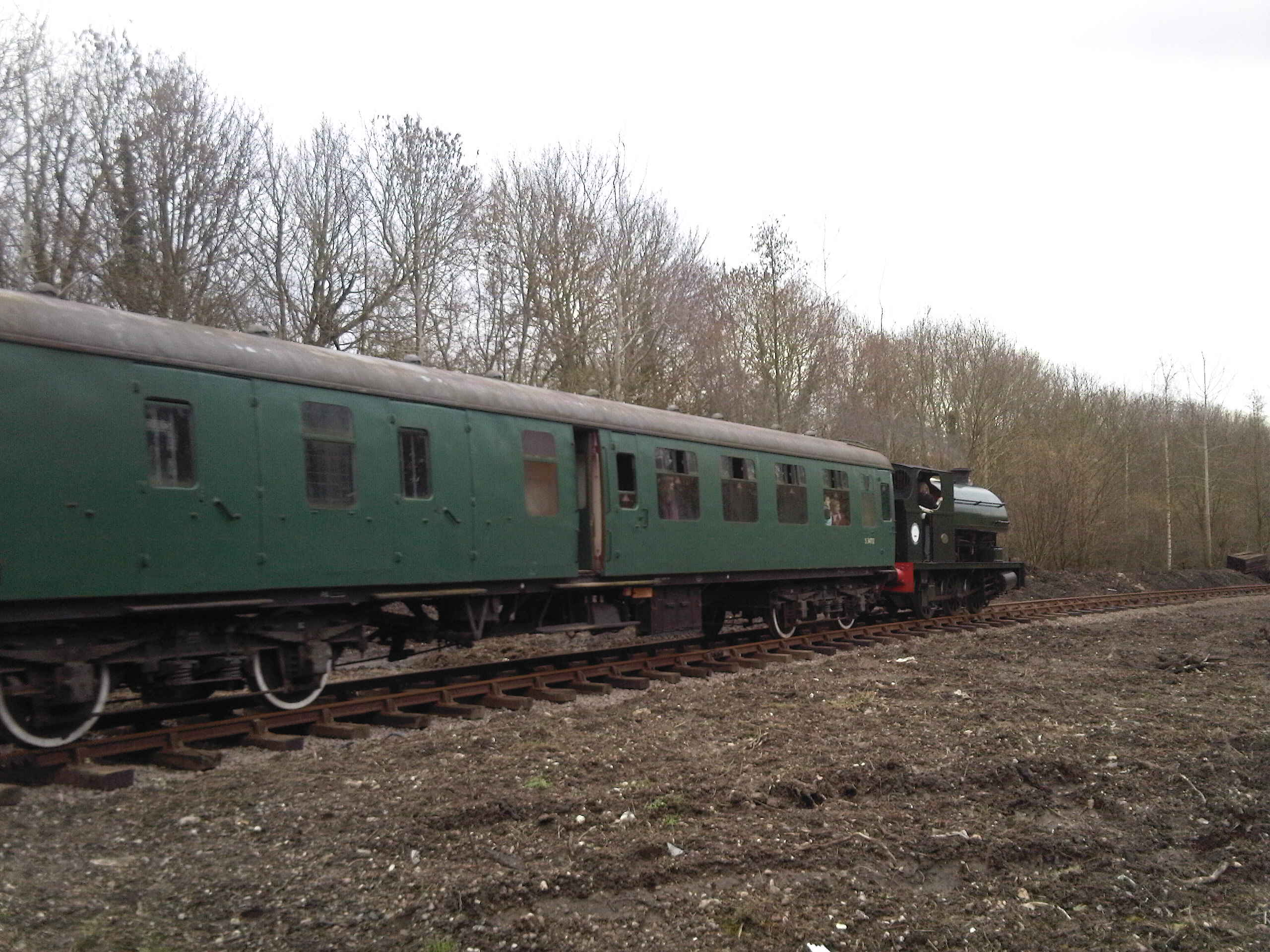
A passenger train in the cleared goods yard at Whitwell

=== Top Field Light Railway ===
In 2016 a 7 1/4 in (184 mm) gauge railway was added at the top field camp site, operated by Stafford class “Tihany” and LNER K2 Loch Ranoch.

== Signal box ==
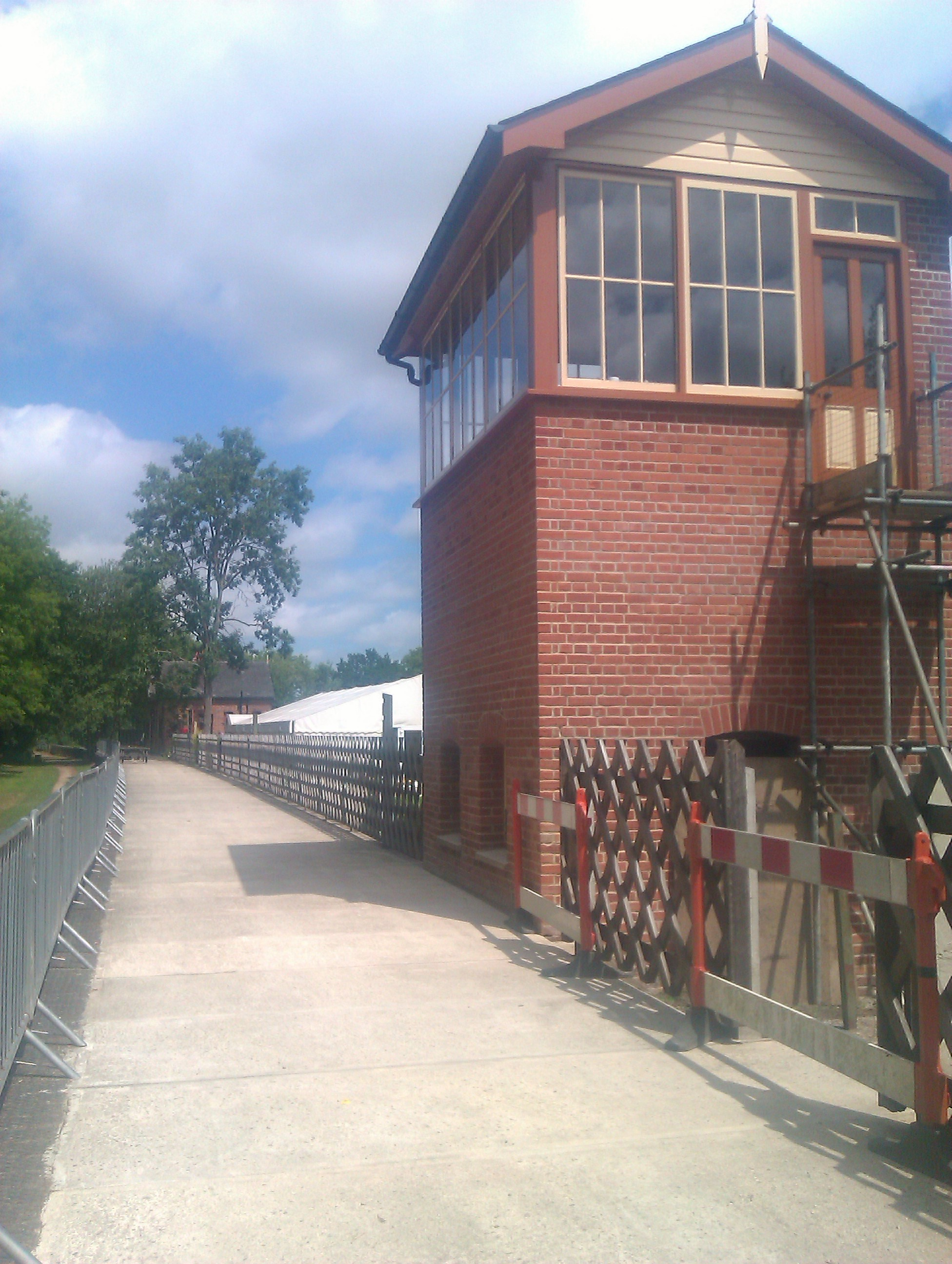
The signal box

The original signal box was located to the south of the station platforms but was demolished following the closure of the line to passengers. The reconstructed box is located on the original footings and reflects the design of the original. The signal box, complete with instruments, was recovered from a garden in Elmswell, Suffolk and the National Railway Museum in York has donated a 21 lever, Saxby and Farmer frame which originally came from Beccles South Box in Suffolk.

== See also ==
- Bressingham Steam and Gardens
- Bure Valley Railway
- Mid-Norfolk Railway
- North Norfolk Railway
- Wells and Walsingham Light Railway
- Yaxham Light Railway
- Barton House Railway
