= Moulton Seas End =

Village in Lincolnshire, England

Coordinates: 52.826209°N 0.037462°W

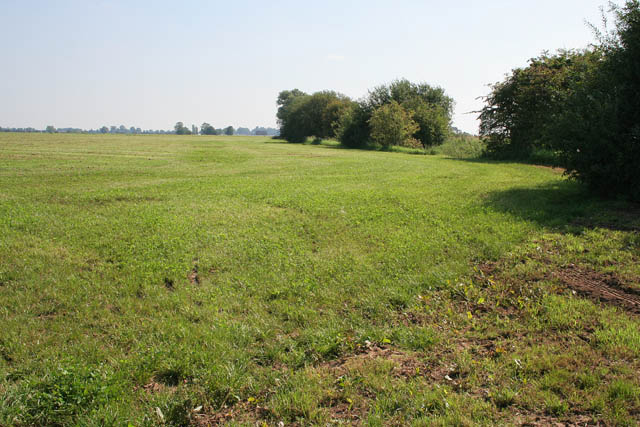
- Farmland near Moulton Seas End

- Location within Lincolnshire
- Population: 850 (2001)
- OS grid reference: TF323272
  - London: 90 mi (140 km) S
- Civil parish: The Moultons
- District: South Holland
- Shire county: Lincolnshire
- Region: East Midlands
- Country: England
- Sovereign state: United Kingdom
- Post town: SPALDING
- Postcode district: PE12
- Dialling code: 01406
- Police: Lincolnshire
- Fire: Lincolnshire
- Ambulance: East Midlands
- UK Parliament: South Holland and The Deepings

Moulton Seas End is a village in the civil parish of The Moultons and the South Holland district of Lincolnshire, England. It is 5 miles (8 km) north-east from the centre of Spalding and 2 miles (3.2 km) north-west from Holbeach. The village of Moulton is 2 miles (3 km) to the south. Moulton Seas End population is included in The Moultons.

Moulton Seas End is a village in an extensive Fenland parish, of over 16 miles (26 km) north to south. The civil parish includes the primary parish village of Moulton, and the villages of Moulton Chapel and Moulton Eaugate.

In 1885 Moulton Seas End (then just 'Seasend' or 'Seaend') was a hamlet. A school existed in which there was a chapel for worship, constructed by subscription in 1868. By 1933 occupations, in what was now a village, included twenty-three farmers, three cottage farmers, five smallholders, a potato merchant, a fruit grower, a butcher, a blacksmith, a higgler—itinerant pedlar—two carpenters, two shopkeepers one of whom ran the post office, and the landlord of the Golden Lion public house.

The Golden Lion public house still exists and there is also a village hall and playing fields. The population of the village is about 850. The village war memorial commemorates twenty-two men killed in the First World War, and three in the Second.
