= Moulton railway station =

Moulton railway station may refer to:

- Moulton railway station (Lincolnshire), England
- Moulton railway station (North Yorkshire), England
