= Weston railway station (Lincolnshire) =

Former railway station in Lincolnshire, England

Coordinates: 52.7874°N 0.0996°W

Weston

General information
- Location: England
- Grid reference: TF281228
- Platforms: 1

Other information
- Status: Disused

History
- Original company: Norwich and Spalding Railway
- Pre-grouping: Midland and Great Northern Joint Railway
- Post-grouping: Midland and Great Northern Joint Railway

Key dates
- 1858: Opened
- 2 March 1959: Closed for passengers
- 3 February 1964: closed for freight
Location

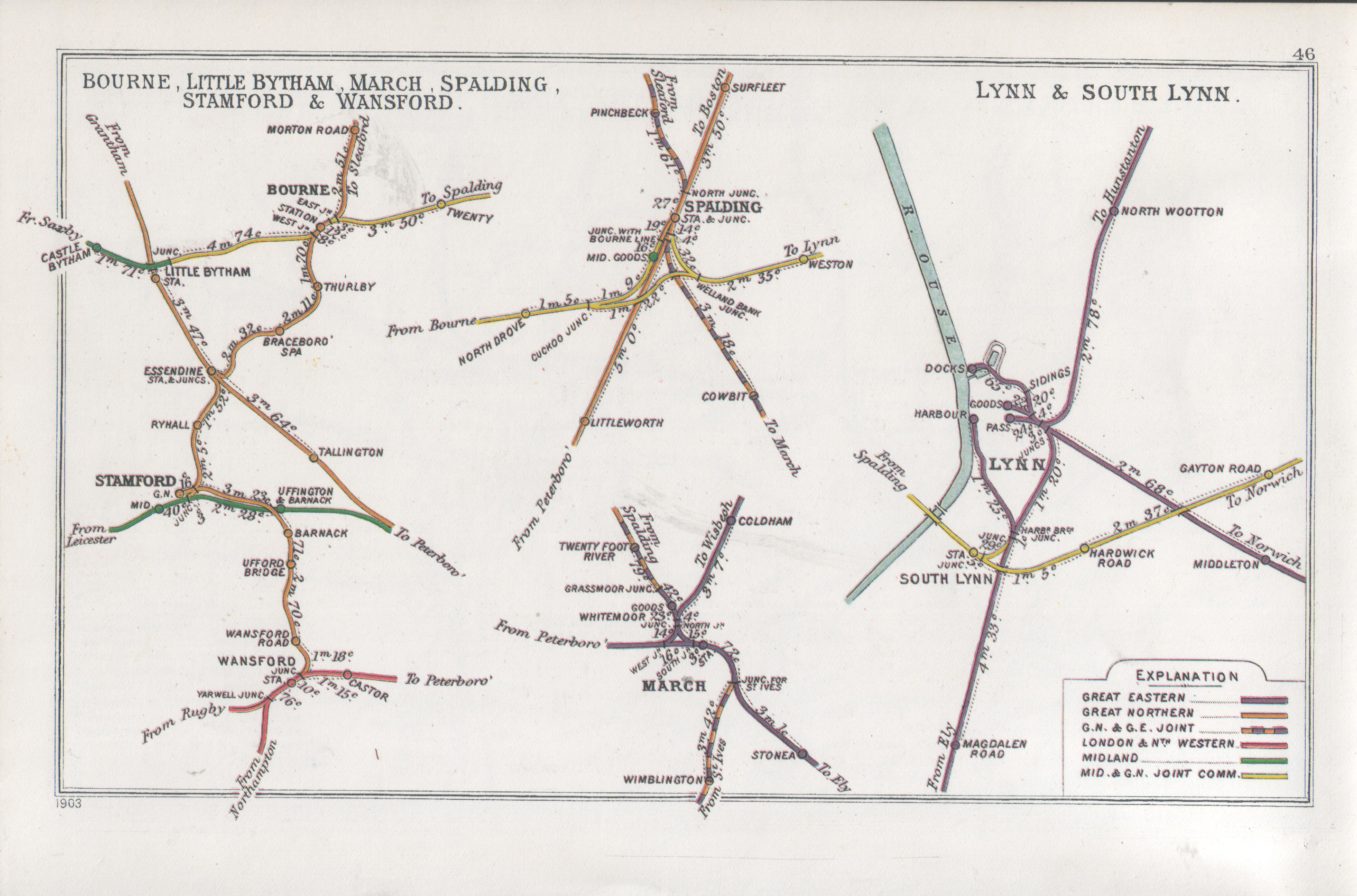
A 1903 Railway Clearing House map of railways in the vicinity of Weston (upper centre)

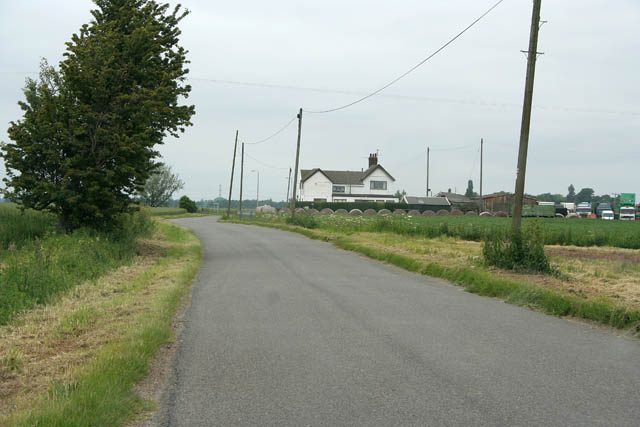
The former station, 1 mile (1.6 km) south of the village

Weston railway station was a station in Weston, Lincolnshire on the Midland and Great Northern Joint Railway, Built by the Norwich and Spalding Railway and opened on 15 November 1858. It was on the main line between the Midlands and the Norfolk Coast, a route commonly used by holidaymakers in the summer months. It closed to passengers on 2 March 1959. The line divided west of here, some trains running in to terminate at Spalding and others carrying on west into the Midlands.

Former Services

Preceding station	Disused railways	Following station
Spalding Line closed, station open	Midland and Great Northern Joint Railway	Moulton Line and station closed
North Drove Line and station closed	Midland and Great Northern Joint Railway	Moulton Line and station closed
