= Guestwick railway station =

Former railway station in Norfolk, England

Coordinates: 52.7936°N 1.0470°E

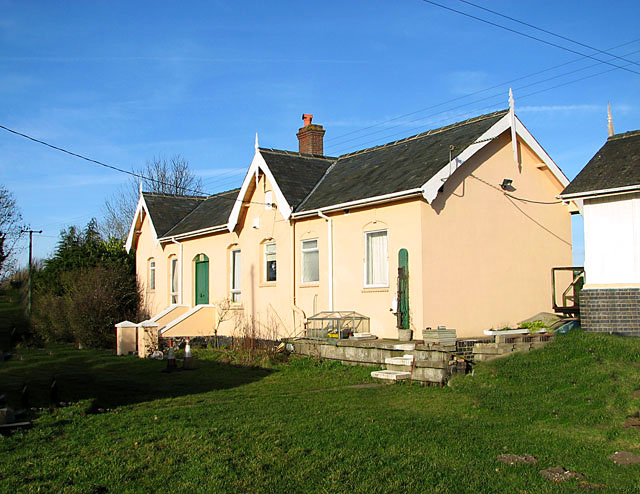
The site of the station in 2011

Guestwick railway station is a former station in Norfolk, England. It was constructed by the Midland and Great Northern Joint Railway in 1882 on the line between Melton Constable and Norwich City. It was closed in 1959. It served the village of Guestwick. It is on the path of Marriott's Way which follows the route of the old line.

Preceding station	Disused railways	Following station
Whitwell & Reepham	Midland and Great Northern; Norwich Branch	Hindolvestone
