= Weston, Lincolnshire =

Village and civil parish in the South Holland district of Lincolnshire, England

Coordinates: 52.806345°N 0.08694°W

Weston
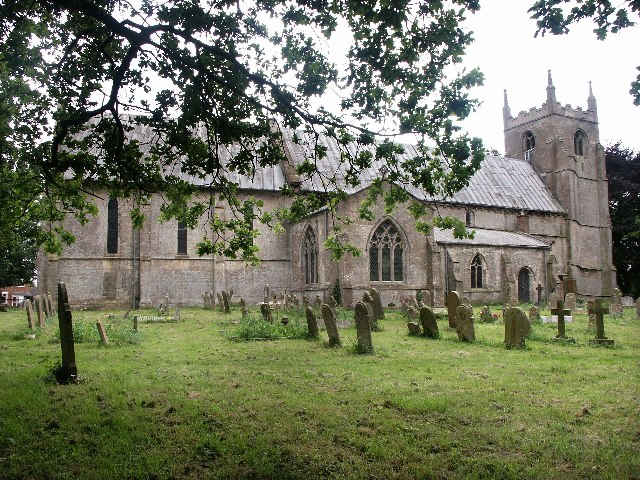
- St Mary's Church, Weston

- Location within Lincolnshire
- Population: 2,054 (2011)
- OS grid reference: TF290249
  - London: 90 mi (140 km) S
- District: South Holland
- Shire county: Lincolnshire
- Region: East Midlands
- Country: England
- Sovereign state: United Kingdom
- Post town: Spalding
- Postcode district: PE12
- Police: Lincolnshire
- Fire: Lincolnshire
- Ambulance: East Midlands
- UK Parliament: South Holland and The Deepings (UK Parliament constituency)

Weston is a village and civil parish in the South Holland district of Lincolnshire, England. It is situated approximately 2 miles (3 km) north-east from the town of Spalding. The Civil Parish also includes Weston Hills. The population of the civil parish including Austendike was at the 2011 census 2,054.

== History ==
There is evidence of a Romano-British settlement which consists of earthworks and pottery dating from the 1st to 2nd centuries AD.

The name is from the Old English West+tun, or "West Village". It is written as "Westune" in the Domesday Book.

Weston railway station on the Spalding and Norwich Railway opened in 1858 and closed in 1959.

The deserted medieval village of Wykeham was once the site of Wykeham Hall, the country residence of the prior of Spalding. All that is left today are earthworks and the ruined chapel of Saint Nicholas.

== Church ==
The ecclesiastical parish is Weston St Mary It is one of the three parishes in the relatively small Cowbit group of the Deanery of West Elloe, in the Diocese of Lincoln. The parish is called Weston St Mary to differentiate it from the adjacent Weston Hills, also in the Cowbit group. The third parish is Cowbit itself.

The limestone parish church is a Grade I listed building dedicated to Saint Mary and dates from 1170. It was restored by George Gilbert Scott between 1858 and 1867, and by J. L. Pearson 1885–56. It has a 15th-century west tower, and the font dates from 1200. The lychgate is a Grade II listed war memorial erected in 1918 of red brick and wood. The churchyard cross is also Grade II listed and a scheduled monument, being medieval in origin with modern additions.

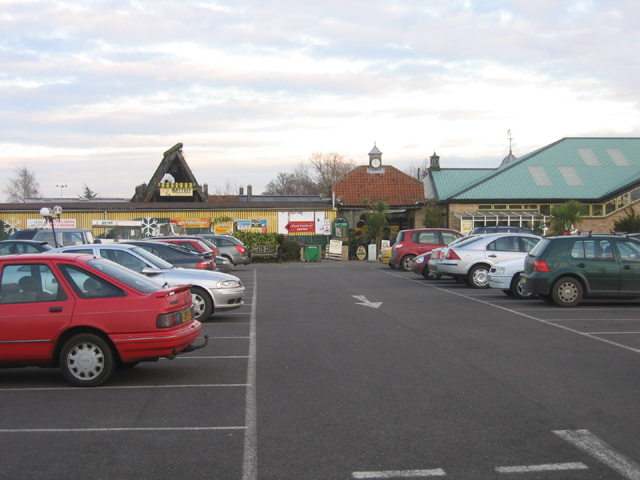
The entrance to Baytree Nurseries, the largest employer in Weston
