= Austendike =

Village in the civil parish of Moulton in Lincolnshire, England

Coordinates: 52.77°N 00.08°W

- Location within Lincolnshire
- OS grid reference: TF2921
- Civil parish: Moulton
- District: South Holland
- Shire county: Lincolnshire
- Region: East Midlands
- Country: England
- Sovereign state: United Kingdom
- Post town: Spalding
- Postcode district: PE12
- Police: Lincolnshire
- Fire: Lincolnshire
- Ambulance: East Midlands

Austendke (alternately called Austendyke) is a village in the civil parish of Moulton in Lincolnshire, England. The population is included in the civil parish of Weston.
