= Wykeham, Weston, Lincolnshire =

Deserted medieval village in England

Coordinates: 52.818550°N 0.108599°W

Wykeham
- OS grid reference: TF275262
  - London: 90 mi (140 km) S
- District: South Holland
- Shire county: Lincolnshire
- Region: East Midlands
- Country: England
- Sovereign state: United Kingdom
- Post town: Spalding
- Postcode district: PE12
- Police: Lincolnshire
- Fire: Lincolnshire
- Ambulance: East Midlands

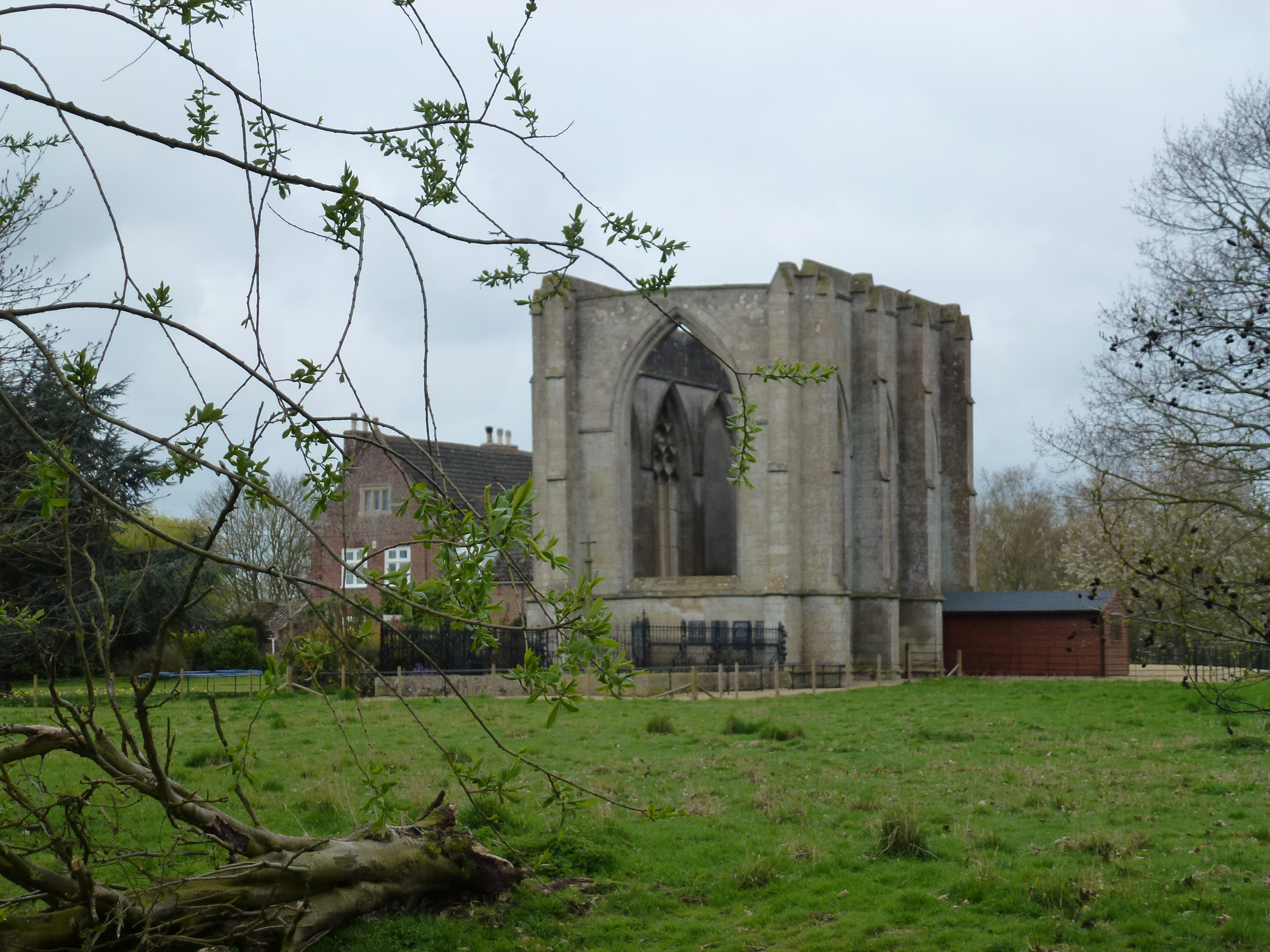
Chapel of St Nicholas, Wykeham

Wykeham /ˈwɪk.əm/ is a deserted medieval village in the civil parish of Weston in the South Holland district of Lincolnshire, England.

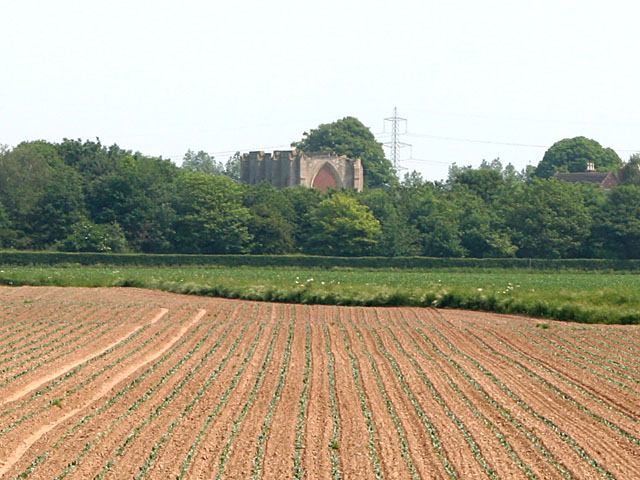
Wykeham Chapel

Wykeham is the site of the ruined chapel of Saint Nicholas and the earthwork remains of Wykeham Hall, which was the country residence of the Prior of Spalding. The limestone chapel, which was built in 1311, became a free chapel at the dissolution, but the roof collapsed in 1782 and it remains a roofless shell. The chapel is now a Grade I listed building and the site is a scheduled monument.
