= Hindolvestone railway station =

Former railway station in Norfolk, England

Coordinates: 52.8267°N 1.0343°E

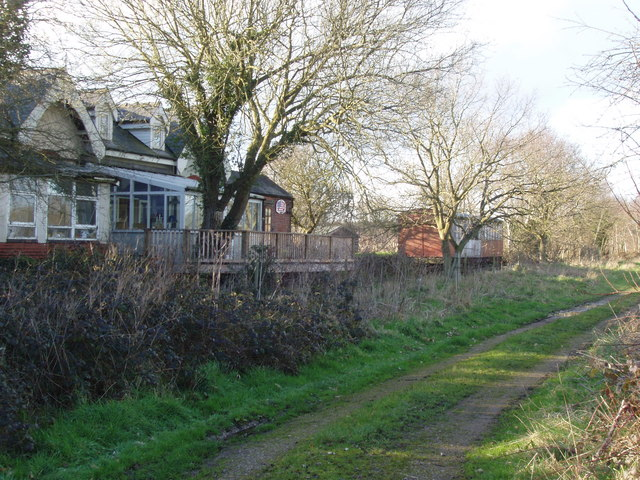
Hindolvestone railway station in 2007

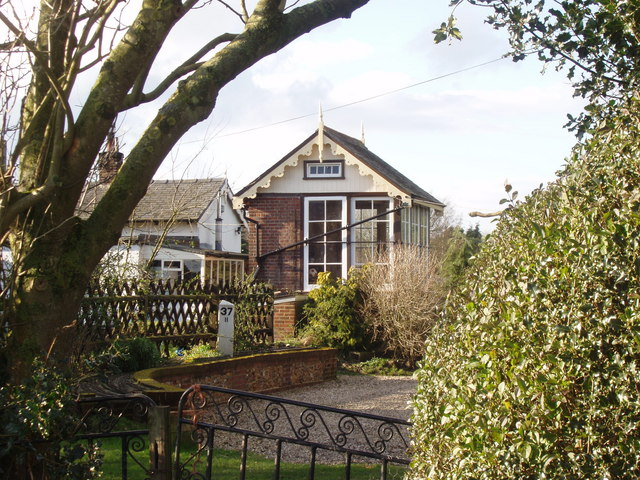
The former signal box

Hindolvestone railway station was in North Norfolk, England. It was part of the Midland and Great Northern Joint Railway branch from Melton Constable to Norwich. It opened in 1882 and closed in 1959. It served the small village of Hindolveston. The station was spelled with an 'e' on the end although OS maps show it without.

According to the Official Handbook of Stations the following classes of traffic were being handled at this station in 1956: G* & P and there was no crane.

Preceding station	Disused railways	Following station
Guestwick	Midland and Great Northern; Norwich Branch	Melton Constable
