= Whaplode railway station =

Former railway station in Lincolnshire, England

Coordinates: 52.7954°N 0.0386°W

Whaplode

General information
- Location: England
- Grid reference: TF322238
- Platforms: 1

Other information
- Status: Disused

History
- Original company: Norwich and Spalding Railway
- Pre-grouping: Midland and Great Northern Joint Railway
- Post-grouping: Midland and Great Northern Joint Railway

Key dates
- 1858: Opened
- 2 March 1959: Closed for passengers
- 3 February 1964: closed for freight
Location

Whaplode railway station was a station in Whaplode, Lincolnshire. Built by the Norwich and Spalding Railway, (later Midland and Great Northern Joint Railway), opened on 1 December 1858, that closed to passengers on 2 March 1959.

Preceding station	Disused railways	Following station
Moulton; Line and station closed	Midland and Great Northern	Holbeach; Line and station closed
