= Weston Hills, Lincolnshire =

Hamlet in Lincolnshire, England

Coordinates: 52.774360°N 0.09922°W

Weston Hills
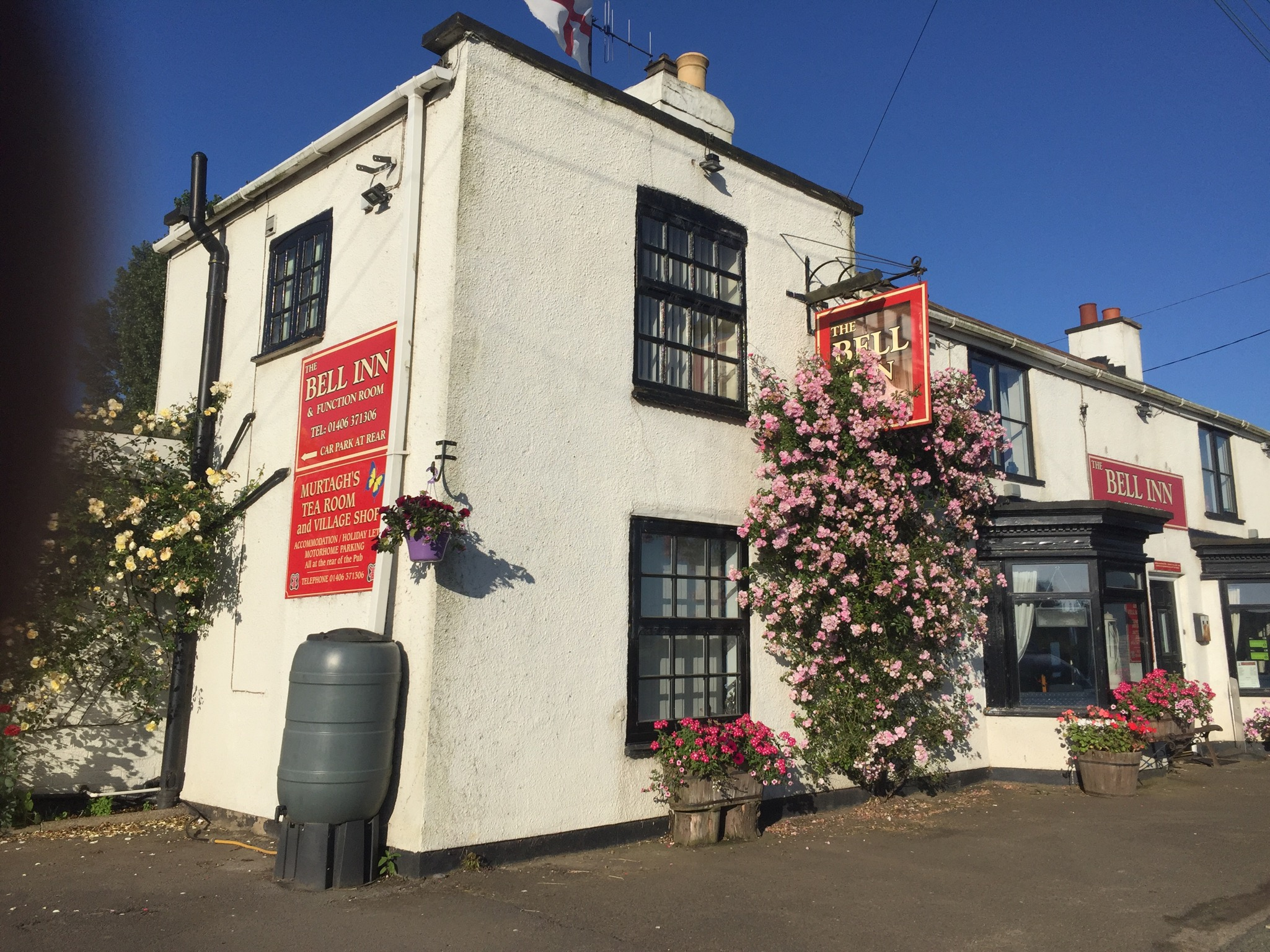
- Pub in Weston Hills

- Location within Lincolnshire
- Population: (2001)
- OS grid reference: TF283213
  - London: 85 mi (137 km) S
- Civil parish: Weston
- District: South Holland
- Shire county: Lincolnshire
- Region: East Midlands
- Country: England
- Sovereign state: United Kingdom
- Post town: SPALDING
- Postcode district: PE12
- Police: Lincolnshire
- Fire: Lincolnshire
- Ambulance: East Midlands
- UK Parliament: South Holland and The Deepings (UK Parliament constituency)

Weston Hills is a hamlet in the civil parish of Weston in the South Holland district of Lincolnshire, England.

Weston Hills, a linear village on a north–south axis, is situated approximately 2 miles (3 km) east from the town of Spalding. Its highest point is 10 feet (3.0 m) above sea level.

The local school is Weston Hills C of E Primary School.

== History ==
=== 1942 air incident ===
On 2 October 1942, an American Boeing B-17F bomber crashed at Weston Hills.

=== 2014 F-15 incident ===
A McDonnell Douglas F-15 Eagle fighter jet crashed in a field next to Weston Hills on 8 October 2014. The pilot ejected and survived the crash; no injuries were reported.
