= Hindolveston Windmill =

Windmill in Norfolk, England

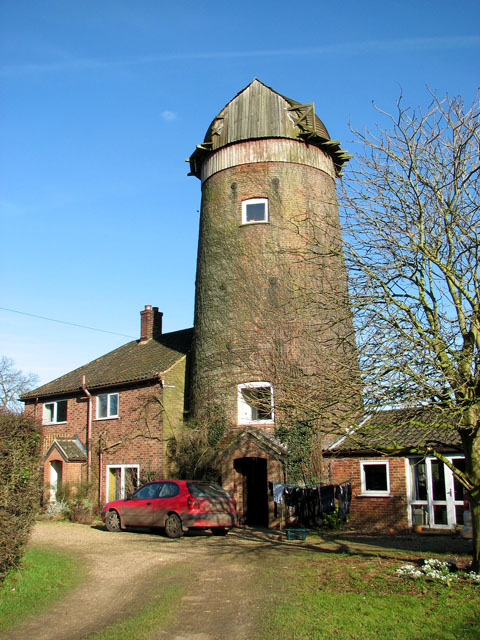
- Hindoveston Windmill, February 2011
- Interactive map of Hindolveston Windmill

Origin
- Mill name: Hindolveston Windmill
- Mill location: Hindolveston, Norfolk, United Kingdom
- Grid reference: TB 0361 2924
- Coordinates: 52°49′19″N 1°01′12″E
- Year built: 1844

Information
- Purpose: Corn mill
- Type: Tower mill
- Storeys: Five storey tower
- No. of sails: Four
- Type of sails: Patent sails
- Windshaft: Cast iron
- Winding: Fantail
- Fantail blades: Eight
- Auxiliary power: Steam engine
- No. of pairs of millstones: Two pairs

Hindolveston Windmill is a tower mill in Hindolveston, Norfolk, United Kindgom. It was built in 1844. The mill was working until 1937. It was truncated during World War II and converted to residential use in 1948.

== History ==
A windmill at Hindolveston is mentioned in the Account Rolls of the Great Hospital, Norwich for 1311–12 and 1218–19. A post mill at Hindolveston was advertised for sale by auction in 1783. It had been run by miller James Loose, who had died. Thomas Pegg was the miller 1829–31. On 29 January 1831, Thomas Groom was struck by one of the sails and killed. James Nurse was the miller 1836–39, when he left to work a post mill at Kelling and John Pegg took the mill. He had the tower mill built in 1844.

John Pegg ran the windmill along with a watermill at Hunworth until 1883. William Pegg was the miller in 1888. He installed a steam engine as auxiliary power. He ran the mill along with the watermill at Hunworth and a windmill and watermill at Thurning. The mill was rented by Agnes Bowman in 1906. A new windshaft was fitted to the mill in 1910. Harry Thomas Davidson was the last miller. He ran the mill from 1922–37, latterly in partnership with his son. By 1936, the mill had lost its fantail and the shutters had been removed from the sails.

During World War II, the top storey of the tower was removed as the mill was declared to be a hazard to aircraft flying from RAF Foulsham. Post-war, the mill was stripped of its machinery by Thomas Smithdale & Sons, the Acle millwrights. It was converted to residential accommodation in 1948. A new cap was fitted in 1979.

== Description ==
The mill was a five storey tower mill. It had a boat shaped cap with a petticoat and gallery. A cast iron windshaft carried four double patent sails, which had seven bays of three shutters. The mill was winded by an eight blade fantail. Two pairs of stones were driven overdrift.
