= Nethergate, Norfolk =

Hamlet in Norfolk, England

Coordinates: 52.821939°N 1.048285°E

Nethergate
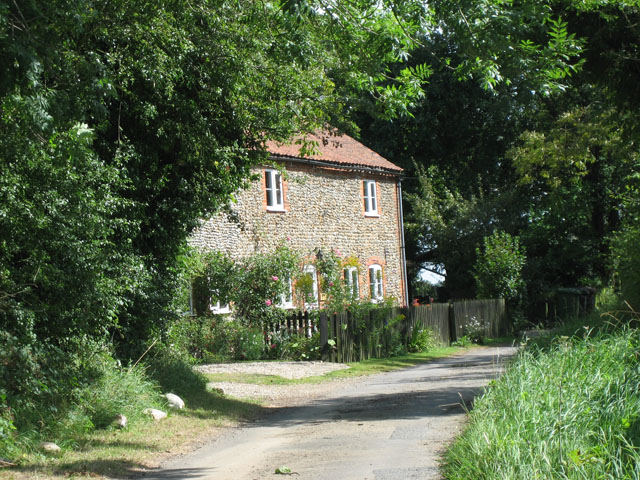
- Cottages in the Hamlet of Nethergate, Norfolk

- Location within Norfolk
- Population: 505 (parish, 2001 census)
- OS grid reference: TG050290
  - London: 131 miles (211 km)
- Civil parish: Hindolveston CP
- District: North Norfolk
- Shire county: Norfolk
- Region: East
- Country: England
- Sovereign state: United Kingdom
- Post town: DEREHAM
- Postcode district: NR20
- Dialling code: 01263
- Police: Norfolk
- Fire: Norfolk
- Ambulance: East of England

Nethergate is a hamlet within the civil parish of Hindolveston in the English county of Norfolk. The hamlet is 15.9 miles (25.6 km) west-south-west of Cromer, 19.3 miles (31.1 km) north-north-west of Norwich and 124 miles (200 km) north-east of London. The Hamlet lies 6.8 miles (10.9 km) south of the town of Holt. The nearest railway station is at Sheringham for the Bittern Line which runs between Sheringham, Cromer and Norwich. The nearest airport is Norwich International Airport.
