= Hindolveston =

Village in Norfolk, England

Coordinates: 52.82338°N 1.0146°E

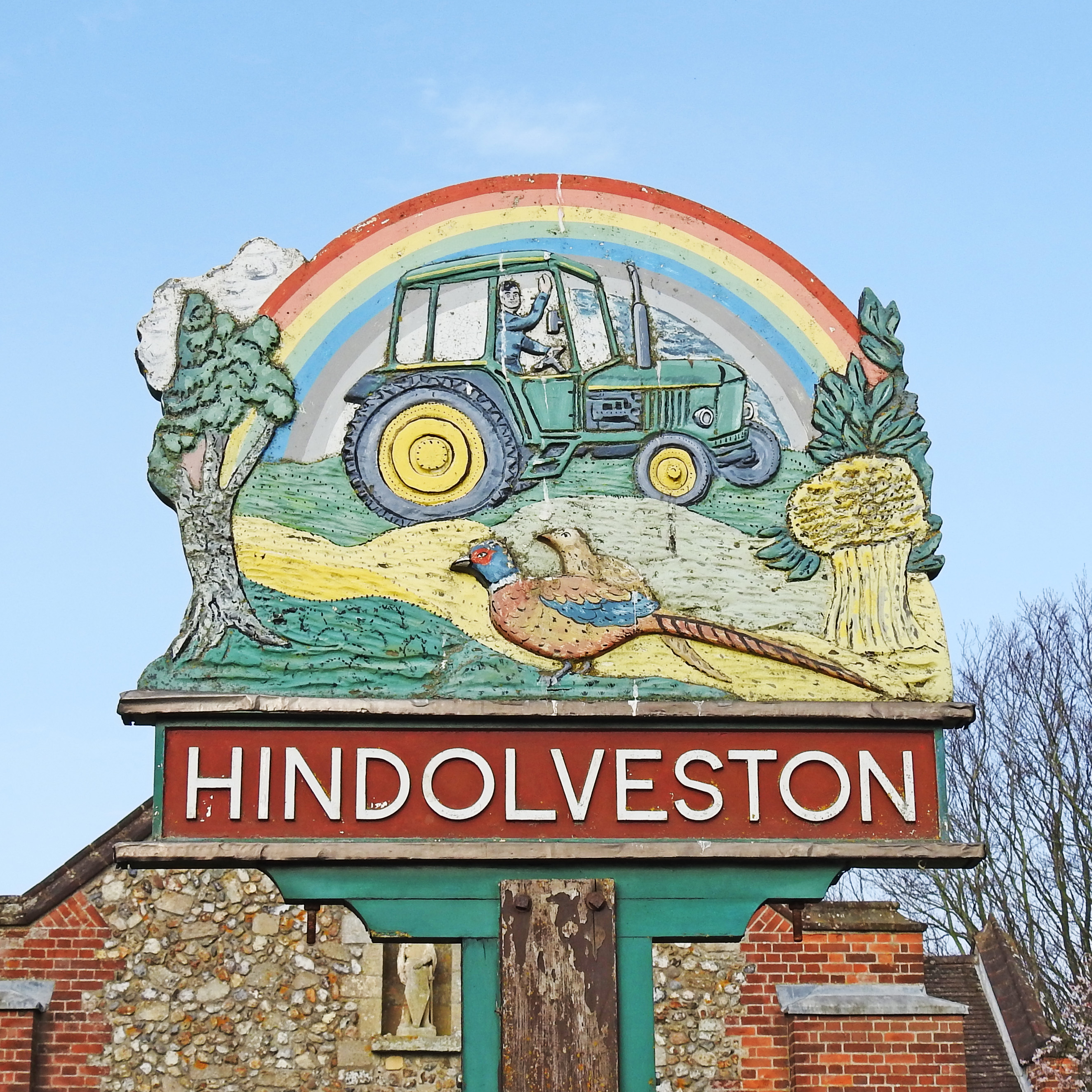
- Hindolveston Village Sign

- Location within Norfolk
- Area: 6.47 sq mi (16.8 km^{2})
- Population: 599 (2021 census)
  - Density: 93/sq mi (36/km^{2})
- OS grid reference: TG030290
  - London: 131 miles (211 km)
- Civil parish: Hindolveston
- District: North Norfolk
- Shire county: Norfolk
- Region: East
- Country: England
- Sovereign state: United Kingdom
- Post town: DEREHAM
- Postcode district: NR20
- Dialling code: 01263
- Police: Norfolk
- Fire: Norfolk
- Ambulance: East of England
- UK Parliament: Broadland and Fakenham

Hindolveston is a village and civil parish in the English county of Norfolk. The civil parish also includes the hamlets of Nethergate and Thurning.

Hindolveston is located 8.4 miles (13.5 km) south of Holt and 20.8 miles (33.5 km) north-north-west of Norwich.

== Correct pronunciation ==
"Hildostone (locally Hindol)"; "Hilvestun"; "Hildosten or Hindol"

== History ==
Hindolveston's name is of Anglo-Saxon origin and derives from the Old English for Hindwulf's settlement.

In the Domesday Book, Hindolveston is listed as a settlement of 17 households in the hundred of Eynesford. In 1086, the village was part of the East Anglian estates of William de Beaufeu.

In 1844, a tower mill was constructed in the village which closed in 1908.

Hindolvestone Railway Station opened in 1882 as a stop on the Norwich Branch of the Midland and Great Northern Joint Railway between Cromer and Norwich City. The station closed in 1959.

In December 1943, Vickers Wellington BK440 of No. 26 Operational Training Unit crashed in the parish after taking off from RAF Little Horwood. In 1985, excavations of the crash site managed to extract one of the propellers.

== Geography ==
According to the 2021 census, Hindolveston has a population of 599 people which shows an increase from the 598 people recorded in the 2011 census.

== St. George's Church ==
Hindolveston's parish church is dedicated to Saint George and dates from the 1930s. St. George's is located within the village on Church Lane and has been Grade II listed since 1959. The church is no longer open for Sunday service.

St. George's was built to replace the earlier St. George's Church which collapsed in August 1892 under the designs of Herbert John Green and executed by Jonathan Beckett.

== Governance ==
Hindolveston is part of the electoral ward of Stibbard for local elections and is part of the district of North Norfolk.

The village's national constituency is Broadland and Fakenham which has been represented by the Conservative Party's Jerome Mayhew MP since 2019.

== War Memorial ==
Hindolveston War Memorial is a celtic-cross atop a square shaft located at the junction of 'The Street' and Melton Road. The memorial was built by T. H. Blythe of Foulsham, opened by Lord Hastings and lists the following names for the First World War:

Rank	Name	Unit	Date of death	Burial/Commemoration
Cpl.	Edward J. English	9th Bn., Norfolk Regiment	11 Oct. 1918	Vis-en-Artois Memorial
LCpl.	William F. Barsted	9th Bn., Norfolk Regiment	18 Oct. 1916	Bancourt British Cemetery
LCpl.	Frederick W. Eke	11th Bn., Royal Sussex Regiment	21 Oct. 1916	Thiepval Memorial
Dvr.	Ernest E. Holsey	Royal Field Artillery att. 48th Division	3 Nov. 1918	Montecchio Precalcino Cem.
Pte.	Richard J. White	4th Bn., Royal Berkshire Regiment	23 Jul. 1916	Unknown
Pte.	Ernest W. Holsey	1st Bn., Cambridgeshire Regiment	27 Aug. 1917	Tyne Cot
Pte.	Charles A. White	26th Bn., Royal Fusiliers	2 Apr. 1918	Arras Memorial
Pte.	Elijah Margetson	124th Coy., Labour Corps	2 Sep. 1917	Potijze Château Cemetery
Pte.	George Mears	2/5th Bn., Lincolnshire Regiment	26 Sep. 1917	Tyne Cot
Pte.	Charles Codling	1st Bn., Norfolk Regiment	21 Apr. 1915	Menin Gate
Pte.	William Craske	1st Bn., Norfolk Regt.	25 Oct. 1914	Le Touret Memorial
Pte.	Harry Codling	4th Bn., Norfolk Regt.	20 Aug. 1915	Helles Memorial
Pte.	Cecil A. Reeve	5th Bn., Norfolk Regt.	19 Apr. 1917	Jerusalem Memorial
Pte.	Alfred D. Eke	1st Bn., South Staffordshire Regiment	27 Oct. 1917	Tyne Cot
Pte.	John W. Strike	9th Bn., Royal Sussex Regiment	29 Sep. 1917	Hargicourt Cemetery
