= Moulton Castle =

- Location within Lincolnshire
- 52.773256°N 0.055841°W
- Type: earthwork
- Periods: Norman and Plantagenet
- Location: near Moulton and Spalding
- Region: Lincolnshire, England

Site notes
- Condition: not intact

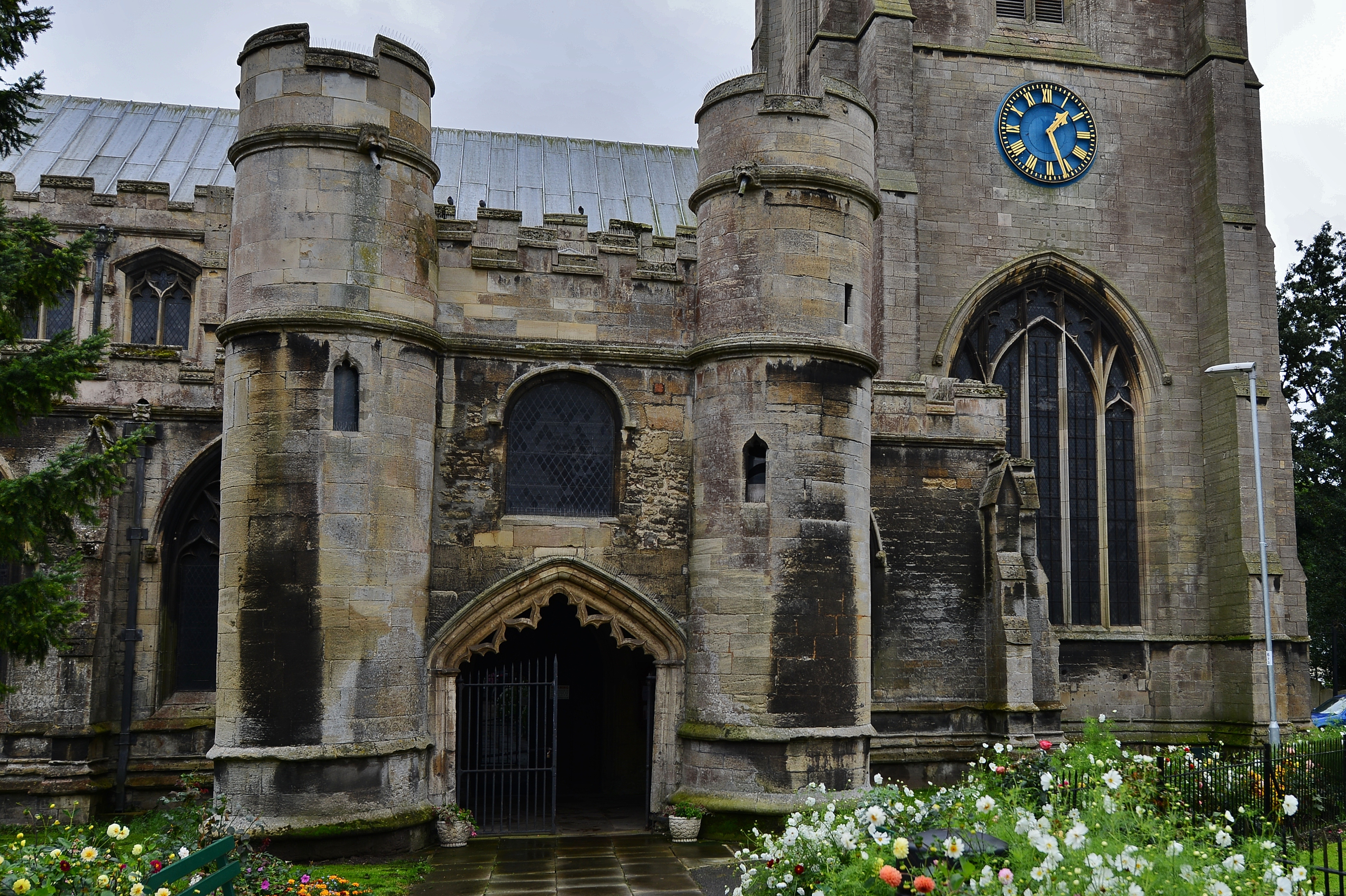
Castle-like towers enclosing the north porch of All Saints' Church, Holbeach

Moulton Castle, also known as King's Hall Park, is a medieval earthwork and scheduled monument situated 1.5 miles (2.4 km) to the south of Moulton, Lincolnshire, England. It probably dates from the twelfth century. It was owned by Thomas de Moulton in the early thirteenth century and it was during this period of unrest when the fortifications were most likely constructed. It remained under occupation by the Moulton family until at least 1313.

Due to the lack of any formal excavation and the paucity of sources, much remains unclear about the site. It is unknown whether it was a true castle or merely a fortified manor house, why it was so isolated and so far from the village, and why and when it fell into disuse. It was in need of repair in 1461 and mostly gone by 1531. There are no ruins visible today, and the site consists of nothing more than a large D-shaped moat and earthwork, barely perceptible from nearby roads. The only investigations into the site took place during World War II when the Home Guard discovered thirteenth-century pottery while digging a bunker, and a later fieldwalking expedition from a local school.

It has been reported that some of the stone from the castle was used to build part of the church porch at nearby Holbeach.
