= Moulton, Lincolnshire =

Rural village in Lincolnshire, England

Coordinates: 52.798024°N 0.062948°W

Moulton
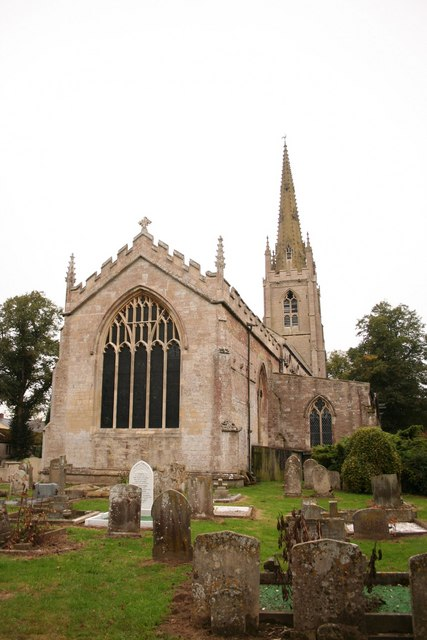
- East Window, All Saints' Church, Moulton

- Location within Lincolnshire
- Population: 3,504 (2011)
- OS grid reference: TF306240
  - London: 90 mi (140 km) S
- Civil parish: The Moultons
- District: South Holland
- Shire county: Lincolnshire
- Region: East Midlands
- Country: England
- Sovereign state: United Kingdom
- Post town: SPALDING
- Postcode district: PE12
- Dialling code: 01406
- Police: Lincolnshire
- Fire: Lincolnshire
- Ambulance: East Midlands
- UK Parliament: South Holland and The Deepings

Moulton is a village in the civil parish of The Moultons, in the South Holland district of Lincolnshire, England. It is situated on the A151 and B1537 roads, 5 miles (8.0 km) east from the centre of Spalding and 3.5 miles (5.6 km) west from Holbeach.

Moulton is the primary village of an extensive Fenland parish, over 16 miles (26 km) in length. The civil parish includes the smaller villages of Moulton Chapel, Moulton Seas End and Moulton Eaugate. The separate village of Moulton Chapel is about 2 miles (3 km) south of Moulton and a similar distance east of Cowbit.

== History ==
Moulton Grammar School was founded through an endowment given in the will of John Harrox (died 1561) who was steward to Sir John Harrington of Weston. The School opened in 1562 with ten pupils and continued to educate boys until 1939 when it merged with Spalding Grammar School. Some school buildings still exist but are now private residences or community facilities. John Harrox is commemorated in the name of the Primary School and the Moulton Harrox sports club. The Moulton Harrox Educational Foundation uses income from the management of more than 200 acres (0.81 km^{2}) to support the education of young people of the district. Old boys of the Grammar School included:

- Johnny Douglas (1895-7), Olympic gold medal winner in boxing and captain of the England Cricket Team
- Rt Rev Kenneth Healey, Bishop of Grimsby from 1958 to 1966
- Walter Plowright (1923–2010) veterinary scientist

Moulton railway station closed to passengers in 1959, on the Spalding to Holbeach line. The station buildings remain but are now private residences although some of the old platform structures still exist.

During the 1970s Moulton was home to an astronomical observatory that was relocated to Sussex in the early 1980s.

On 28 July 2005, a mini-tornado swept through the village, damaging the church roof and some other properties in the vicinity, depositing glass tens of metres away. This occurred as part of an outbreak which also included the Birmingham tornado on the same day.

On 3 May 2016 the civil parish was renamed from "Moulton" to "The Moultons".

On 19 July 2016, a shooting occurred in nearby Spalding. The two victims, Claire and Charlotte Hart, and the gunman, Lance Hart, were residents of Moulton. Following the attack, Lincolnshire Police raided the family home in the village.

== Landmarks ==
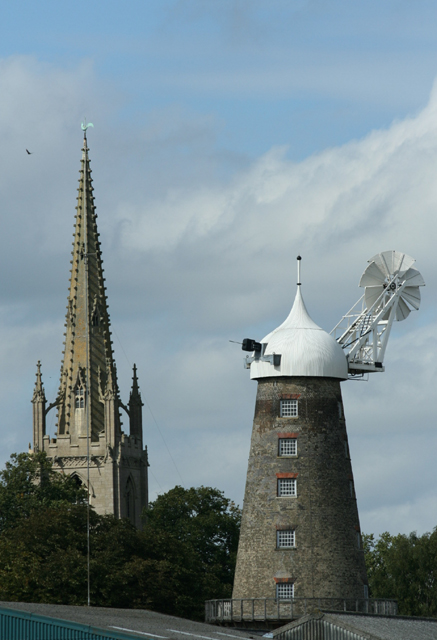
Tower mill and All Saints' spire, Moulton

Moulton's chief landmarks are All Saints' Church, known as "The Queen of the Fens", and Moulton Windmill, the tallest tower mill in the United Kingdom.

All Saints' Church was built about 1180, instigated by Prior John of Spalding. It took approximately 60 to 70 years to build, and was heavily restored from 1866 to 1867 by William Smith. The church has a rood screen dating from around 1425. There is a memorial in the floor of the church to Prudence Corby, who apparently died on "Julye the 36th 1793". The taller and slender spire of the church reaches 158 feet (48 metres) in height. The church is a Grade I listed building.

Moulton Windmill, built in 1822, ground wheat and other products until 1995, despite losing its sails in 1895. The Friends of Moulton Mill was established to restore the Grade I listed mill to full working order. The mill was a subject of the first series of BBC2's Restoration, after which it received a Heritage Lottery Fund grant, and benefited from fundraising events. A café and shop was built, and the mill adapted for disabled access. New sails were fitted on 21 November 2011 and on 28 April 2013 the first bag of flour to be ground with wind power in over 100 years was produced.

The remains of Moulton Castle, now a small mound of earth and a moat, lie south of the village.

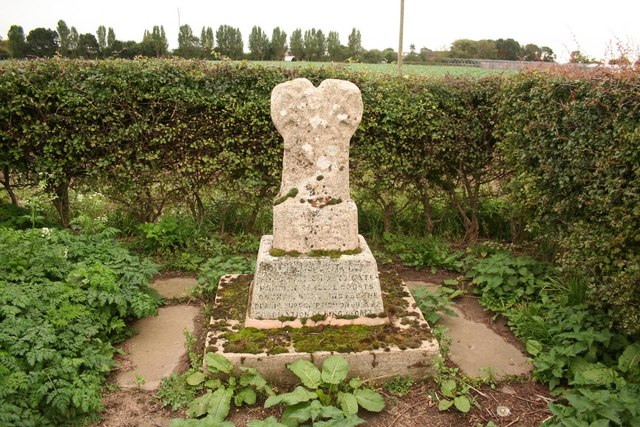
The Elloe Stone

Located nearby, just off the A151, is the Elloe Stone, believed to mark the site of the moot of the Elloe wapentake in Danish times.

== Notable people ==
- G. D'Arcy Boulton (1759 – 1834), a lawyer, judge and political figure in Upper Canada
- John Molson (1763 – 1836), major brewer and entrepreneur in Canada, founder of the Molson family
