= Holbeach railway station =

Former railway station in Lincolnshire, England

Coordinates: 52.7996°N 0.01430°E

Holbeach

General information
- Location: England
- Grid reference: TF357243
- Platforms: 2

Other information
- Status: Disused

History
- Original company: Norwich and Spalding Railway
- Pre-grouping: Midland and Great Northern Joint Railway
- Post-grouping: Midland and Great Northern Joint Railway

Key dates
- 1858: Opened
- 2 March 1959: Closed for passengers
- 5 April 1965: closed for freight
Location

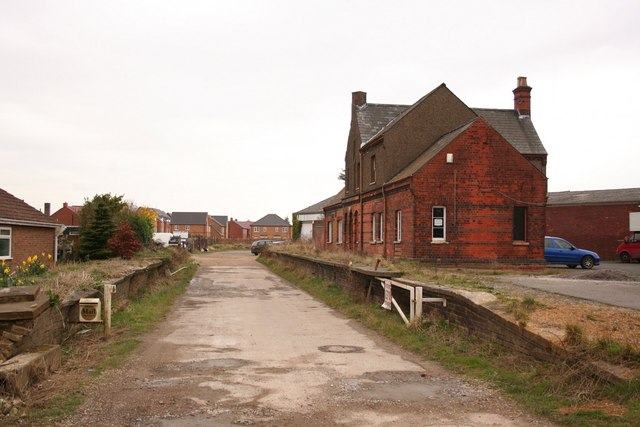
Holbeach Station in 2008

Holbeach railway station was a station in Holbeach, Lincolnshire. It opened on 15 November 1858 and closed on 2 March 1959. The station buildings survived including station, up and down platform and the large goods shed (used as a garage).

The area is being developed for housing and the station is to be restored and converted into flats.

Preceding station	Disused railways	Following station
Whaplode; Line and station closed	Midland and Great Northern	Fleet; Line and station closed
