= Murder of Charlotte and Claire Hart =

Murder-suicide in Lincolnshire

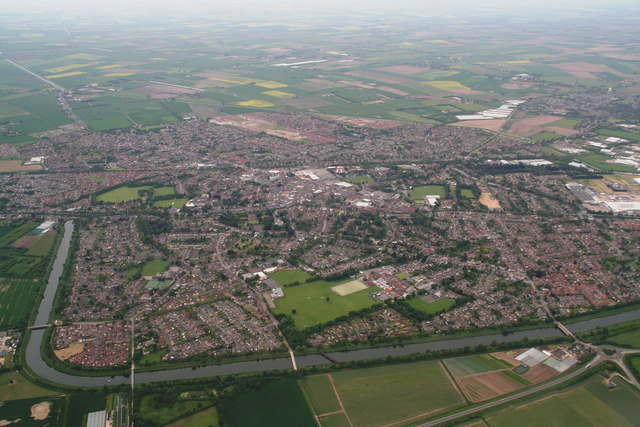
- An aerial view of Spalding in 2013.

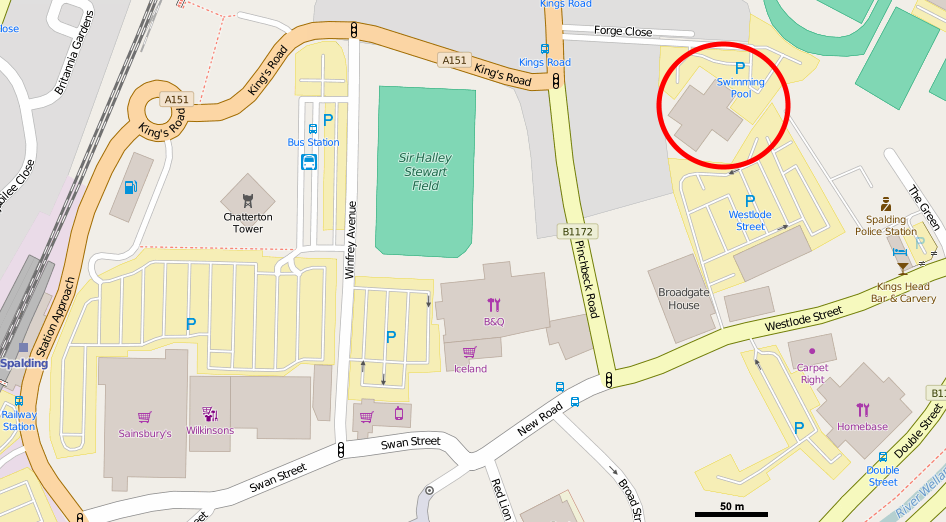
- Map of Spalding town centre, with the site of the shooting circled in red.
- Location: 52°47′25″N 0°8′57″W; Spalding, Lincolnshire, England
- Date: 19 July 2016; 09:00 (UTC+1)
- Target: Killer's wife and daughter
- Attack type: Shooting, murder-suicide, uxoricide, filicide
- Weapon: Shotgun
- Deaths: 3 (including the perpetrator)
- Victims: Charlotte Hart, Claire Hart
- Perpetrator: Lance Hart

On 19 July 2016, Lance Hart shot and killed his wife and daughter at the Castle Sports Complex in the town centre of Spalding, Lincolnshire, England. He then killed himself.

== Shooting ==
At around 09:00 BST on 19 July 2016, 57-year-old builders merchant Lance Hart fatally shot his 50-year-old wife Claire Hart and 19-year-old daughter Charlotte Hart outside the entrance to the swimming pool at the Castle Sports Complex in Spalding town centre, using a single-barrelled shotgun. Claire Hart was shot in the chest and abdomen and Charlotte Hart was shot in the upper abdomen. Hart then turned the gun on himself, killing himself instantly with a gunshot wound to the head at the scene of the murder.

== Aftermath ==
The East Midlands Ambulance Service responded to the shooting and treated the victims but were unable to save them. The local air ambulance also attended the incident. The Castle Sports Complex was closed as a result of the shooting and nearby schools were put in lockdown until midday, by which time Lincolnshire Police had confirmed that the incident was not terrorism-related and that the gunman was dead. During the course of the afternoon the names of the victims and killer were released, and police raided a house in Hatt Close in the village of Moulton, five miles from Spalding. Police also confirmed that no shots had been fired at, or by, police officers. Counselling support was offered to staff at the Castle Sports Complex following the shooting.

On the day of the shooting, Labour Party leader Jeremy Corbyn tweeted his condolences, saying: "Shocking events in Spalding, Lincolnshire. My thoughts are with the victims and their families". The leader of Lincolnshire County Council, Martin Hill, said that he was "shocked" by the shooting. Councillor Gary Taylor, South Holland District Council's representative for the Spalding Castle ward in which the attack took place, said: "It's terrible news and local people are very shocked. It's a very quiet place, gun crime does not exist in this area at all." On Twitter, the Diocese of Lincoln said that their "thoughts and prayers are with the community of Spalding at this time".

Tributes were left outside the Hart family home in Moulton by local residents following the shooting. Further tributes were left at the local church, where mourners lit candles.

The day after the shooting, a former neighbour said Hart had threatened him with a shotgun over a minor planning dispute, although, to his regret, he had not reported the incident.

The funeral of Claire and Charlotte Hart was held on 16 August 2016 at All Saints Church, Moulton. The church could not accommodate all the mourners, and the service was relayed by loudspeaker to those outside. Reverend Barbara Hutchinson read out a tribute written by Charlotte's brothers Ryan and Luke, in which they said: "We know that right now you will both be looking upon us and wishing us the strength to carry on... With your love, inspiration and determination as an example we have been shown a resilience that cannot be matched."

== Inquest ==
An inquest into the three deaths was opened and adjourned on 27 July 2016. The inquest resumed at South Lincolnshire Coroner's Office in Boston before coroner Paul Cooper on 27 October 2016.

The court was told that Claire Hart had moved out of the family home in Moulton five days before the murder. Detective Inspector Helen Evans said Claire Hart had told a colleague that she was "worn out" by her husband's behaviour and described him as being a "controlling and selfish man". Claire Hart was described as "beaming and really happy" in the days after leaving her husband. On the day of the shooting, she had told her husband she was going swimming and arranged to meet him later to exchange documents and photographs. After the shooting, a USB stick was found in Lance Hart's car. It contained a twelve-page document in which he detailed his plans for revenge.

The coroner said: "In my view, this was a cold, calculated, scheming man who went out and deliberately murdered his wife and daughter... If he had lived... he would have been charged with murder, unfortunately he didn't live to face the consequences of his actions." He returned a verdict of unlawful killing on Charlotte and Claire Hart and suicide on Lance Hart.

After the inquest, Detective Inspector Evans confirmed that Hart did not have a licence for the shotgun and that the police had been unable to establish how he had obtained it.

== Luke Hart's open letter ==
In April 2017, Charlotte Hart's brother Luke published an open letter on Facebook, in which he described how his father had subjected the family to years of "frightening and bullying" behaviour. Luke and his younger brother Ryan had saved money to help their mother move out of the home she shared with her husband. Luke Hart described his father as a "tyrant" who killed himself in an "act of cowardice". He hoped that by speaking out, he would help other families.
