= Moulton Chapel =

Village in the South Holland district of Lincolnshire, England

Coordinates: 52.746347°N 0.084105849°W

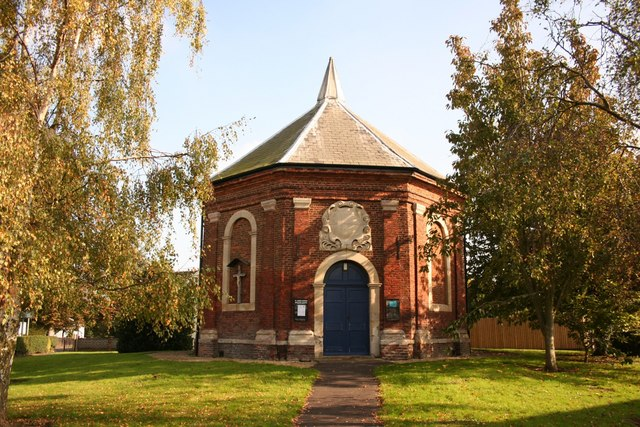
- St James', Moulton Chapel

- Location within Lincolnshire
- Population: 3,504 (2011)
- OS grid reference: TF294182
  - London: 85 mi (137 km) S
- Civil parish: The Moultons
- District: South Holland
- Shire county: Lincolnshire
- Region: East Midlands
- Country: England
- Sovereign state: United Kingdom
- Post town: SPALDING
- Postcode district: PE12
- Dialling code: 01406
- Police: Lincolnshire
- Fire: Lincolnshire
- Ambulance: East Midlands
- UK Parliament: South Holland and The Deepings

Moulton Chapel is a village in the South Holland district of Lincolnshire, England. It is on the B1357 road, 4 miles (6 km) south from Moulton, 5 miles (8 km) south-west from Holbeach and 4 miles south-east from Spalding. The village is in the civil parish of The Moultons where the population was 3,504 at the 2011 census.

== History ==
In 1885 Kelly's Directory noted Moulton Chapel as a chapelry of Moulton, with a small octagonal chapel, erected in 1722. The living was a perpetual curacy.

The 1722 chapel of St James, by William Sands, senior of Spalding, was a rebuild of an earlier chapel, and was enlarged in 1886. In 1896 Moulton Chapel became a separate ecclesiastical parish under the name of Moulton St James. Pevsner notes the church as a red-brick octagon with a chancel added in 1886, and a domed interior. The style is Dutch, influenced by late 17th-century fen drainers. There is a marble font, and a west gallery probably from the 19th century. St James' is a Grade II* listed building.

With St James', on Roman Road, is a Grade II listed 1865 red-brick tower windmill.

In the late 1820s Thomas Nutt of Moulton Chapel developed and patented an improvement to beehives that allowed for heat regulation through improved ventilation, helped to prevent swarming, and encouraged bees to occupy other adjacent hives, thereby obviating the need to destroy bees in the collection of honey. The better welfare of bees produced a greater honey yield. Nutt laid out his invention in his 1832 book Humanity to Honey Bees.

== Education ==
Moulton Chapel Primary School has National Healthy Schools Status and belongs to the Schools Sports Partnership. Its 2016 Ofsted Inspection judgement rated the school as 'Grade 2 Good' for overall effectiveness.

== Notable residents ==
- Benjamin Zephaniah "spent his final years in Moulton Chapel".
