= Moulton Windmill =

Windmill in Lincolnshire, England

Coordinates: 52.79866°N 0.06435°W

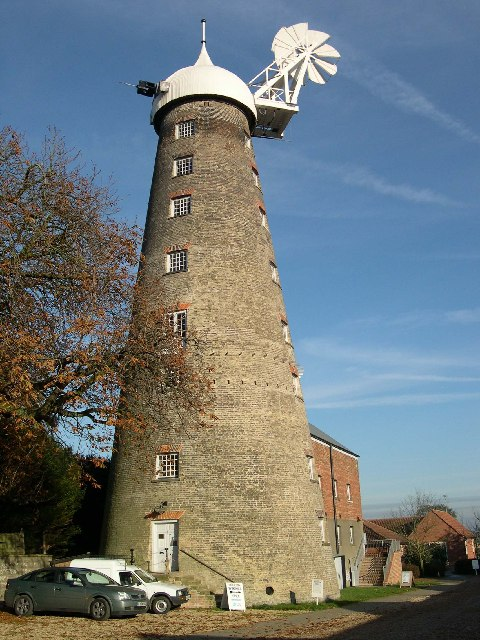
The mill in 2005

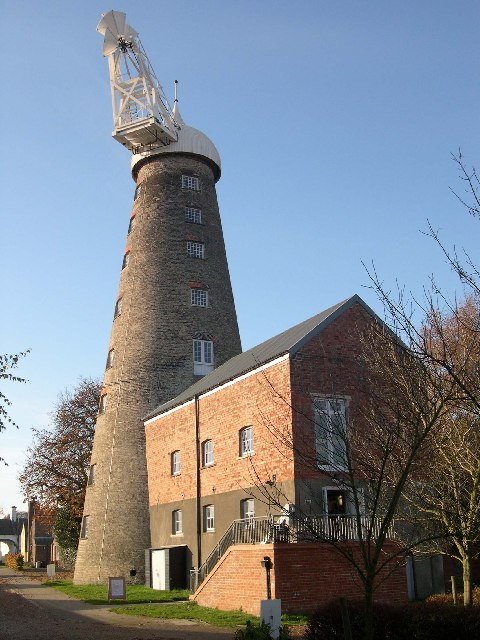
Moulton Windmill

Moulton Windmill in the Lincolnshire village of Moulton, between Spalding and Holbeach is a restored windmill claimed to be the tallest tower mill in the United Kingdom.

The nine-storeyed mill is 80 ft (24.4 metres) to the curb and 100 ft (29.6 metres) to top of the ogee cap. In full working order again with its (or her) four patent sails on, Moulton mill is the tallest working windmill in Great Britain and one of the tallest worldwide. (The 9-storey tower windmill at Sutton, near Stalham, Norfolk has about 67 ft 6 in to the curb, 79 ft 6 in to the top of the Norfolk boat-shaped cap).

The mill, built in c. 1822 by Robert King, was a fully functioning windmill, grinding wheat and other products. However, on 20 December 1894, the sails were damaged in a harsh gale and were removed in 1895. Soon afterwards, a steam system was installed to power the mill. A. W. Tindall leased it from the King family from 1890 until 1921. The Biggadike family, who took over tenancy of the mill in 1924 continued to mill, albeit small quantities of animal feed, until 1995.

A local campaign was established to restore the Grade I listed mill to full working condition. In 2003, the mill featured on the first series of BBC2's Restoration with Tim Wonnacott as its Celebrity Advocate. The project won a large Heritage Lottery Fund grant, which, along with many fundraising events has meant that the "Friends of Moulton Mill" campaign has succeeded in raising enough money to restore and refurbish the mill's structure and add a new cap. The new white ogee cap, (which weighs 14 ton) is visible for miles across the flat Fenland landscape. A café and shop has also been built, and the mill has disabled access, allowing disabled visitors to see some of the mill's inner workings. The Friends of Moulton Mill have encouraged local people to "sponsor" a sail shutter. In March 2007, the mill ground flour again. The reefing gallery, an external balcony which is 40 ft from the ground, was restored in June 2008.

New sails were fitted on 21 November 2011 to complete the restoration of the mill. The community restoration took 14 years to complete at a cost of nearly £2m.

On 28 April 2013 the first bag of flour in over 100 years was ground with wind power.
