= Moulton railway station (Lincolnshire) =

Former railway station in Lincolnshire, England

Coordinates: 52.7922°N 0.0638°W

Moulton

General information
- Location: England
- Grid reference: TF305234
- Platforms: 2

Other information
- Status: Disused

History
- Original company: Norwich and Spalding Railway
- Pre-grouping: Midland and Great Northern Joint Railway
- Post-grouping: Midland and Great Northern Joint Railway

Key dates
- 1858: Opened
- 2 March 1959: Closed for passengers
- 15 June 1964: closed for freight
Location

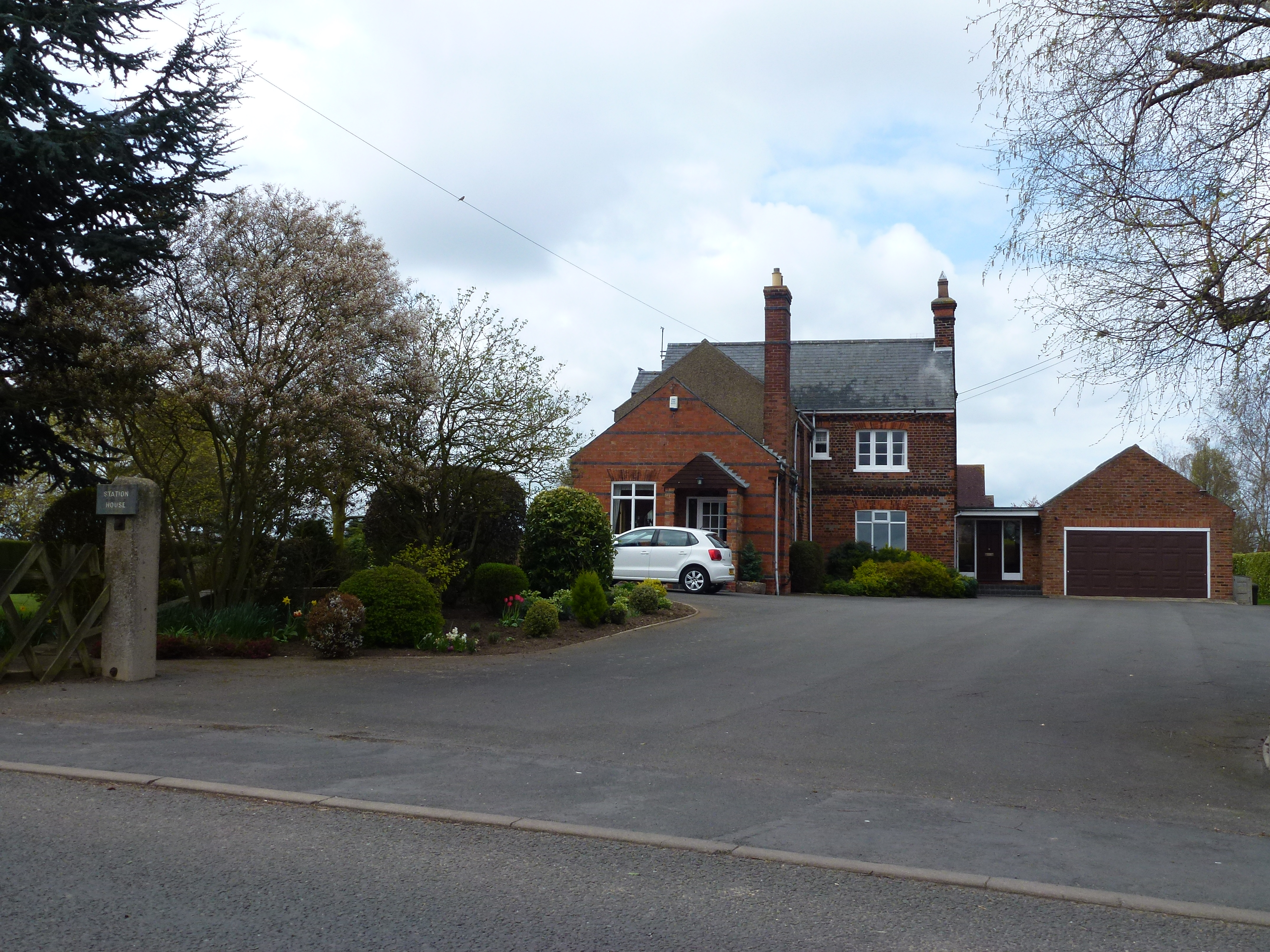
Former Station buildings, now a private house

Moulton (Lincolnshire) railway station was a station in Moulton, Lincolnshire. Built by the Norwich and Spalding Railway, (later Midland and Great Northern Joint Railway), opened on 15 November 1858, that closed to passengers on 2 March 1959.

Preceding station	Disused railways	Following station
Weston; Line and station closed	Midland and Great Northern	Whaplode; Line and station closed
