= Wakerley =

Village in Northamptonshire, England

Coordinates: 52.5849°N 0.5919°W

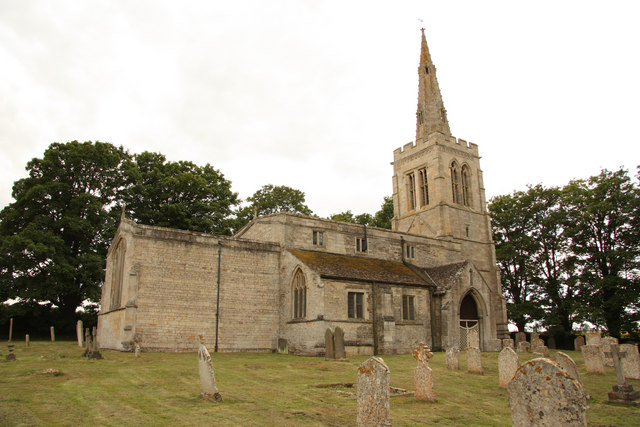
- St John the Baptist's church

- Location within Northamptonshire
- Population: approximately 60
- OS grid reference: SP9599
- Unitary authority: North Northamptonshire
- Ceremonial county: Northamptonshire
- Region: East Midlands
- Country: England
- Sovereign state: United Kingdom
- Post town: Oakham
- Postcode district: LE15
- Dialling code: 01572
- Police: Northamptonshire
- Fire: Northamptonshire
- Ambulance: East Midlands
- UK Parliament: Corby and East Northamptonshire

Wakerley is a linear village and civil parish in the county of Northamptonshire, England. Forming part of North Northamptonshire, Wakerley is close to, and south of, the River Welland that forms the boundary with Rutland; its nearest neighbour, Barrowden, is in that county and accessible by a footbridge. Wakerley is in the area of Rockingham Forest and Wakerley Great Wood is one of the forest's largest remnants. The population of the village is included in the civil parish of Duddington with Fineshade.

The village's name origin is dubious. 'Osier wood/clearing' or perhaps, 'watcher wood/clearing'.

St John the Baptist's church, Grade I listed, has been in the care of the Churches Conservation Trust since the early 1970s.

Wakerley and Barrowden railway station closed in 1966. Recent evidence points to Wakerley's industrial history as an iron-smelting centre. Brick-built calcining kilns were used for reducing iron ore before transport to the Corby Steelworks.
