= Joseph Boothroyd Corby =

British architect (1839–1913)

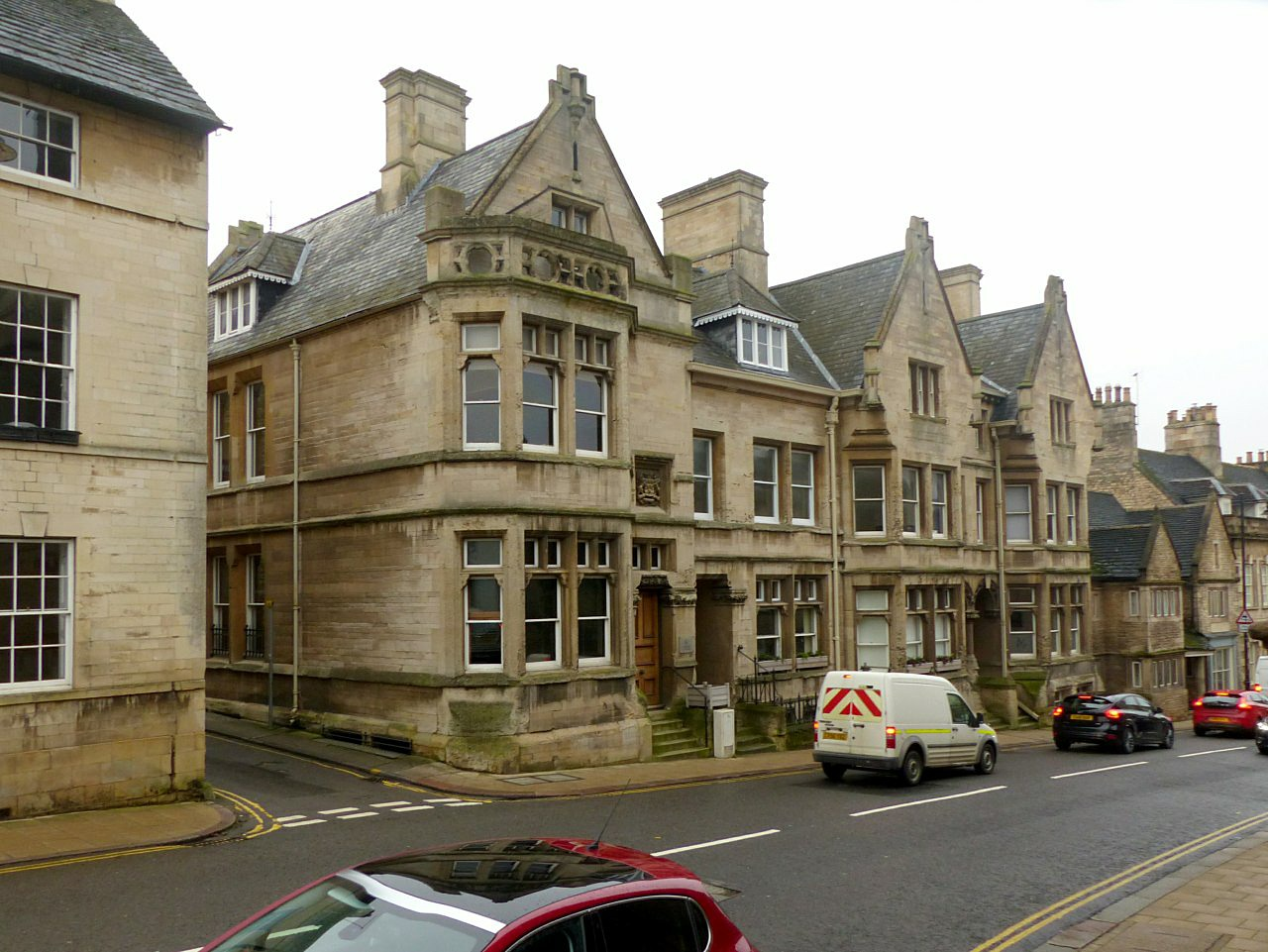
- Burghley Estate Office, and 62–63 High Street St Martins, Stamford
- Born: 1839; Stamford
- Died: 16 August 1913 (aged 73–74); Stamford
- Education: Articled to Edward Browning of Stamford
- Occupation: Architect
- Practice: 15 All Saints Place Stamford and 1 Gresham Buildings, Basinghall Street, London E. C. in 1896

Joseph Boothroyd Corby (1839–1913) was an English architect who worked in Stamford, Lincolnshire.

== Career ==
Joseph Boothroyd Corby was born in Stamford and was articled to the local architect Edward Browning. He later became the surveyor of the Burghley Estates for the Marquess of Exeter. He was elected a fellow of the Surveyors' Institute in 1891. He was also a member of the Council of the Society of Architects, a body that was related to the RIBA, but whose members had not a formal architectural qualification. A member and PMG of the Stamford District Oddfellows and chairman and surveyor to the Stamford Building Society. He took a prominent part in Stamford Town Council from 1891 as a Conservative and became mayor of Stamford in 1912. He was also a member of Kesteven County Council, representing Stamford.

== Works include ==
=== Public, commercial buildings and museums. ===
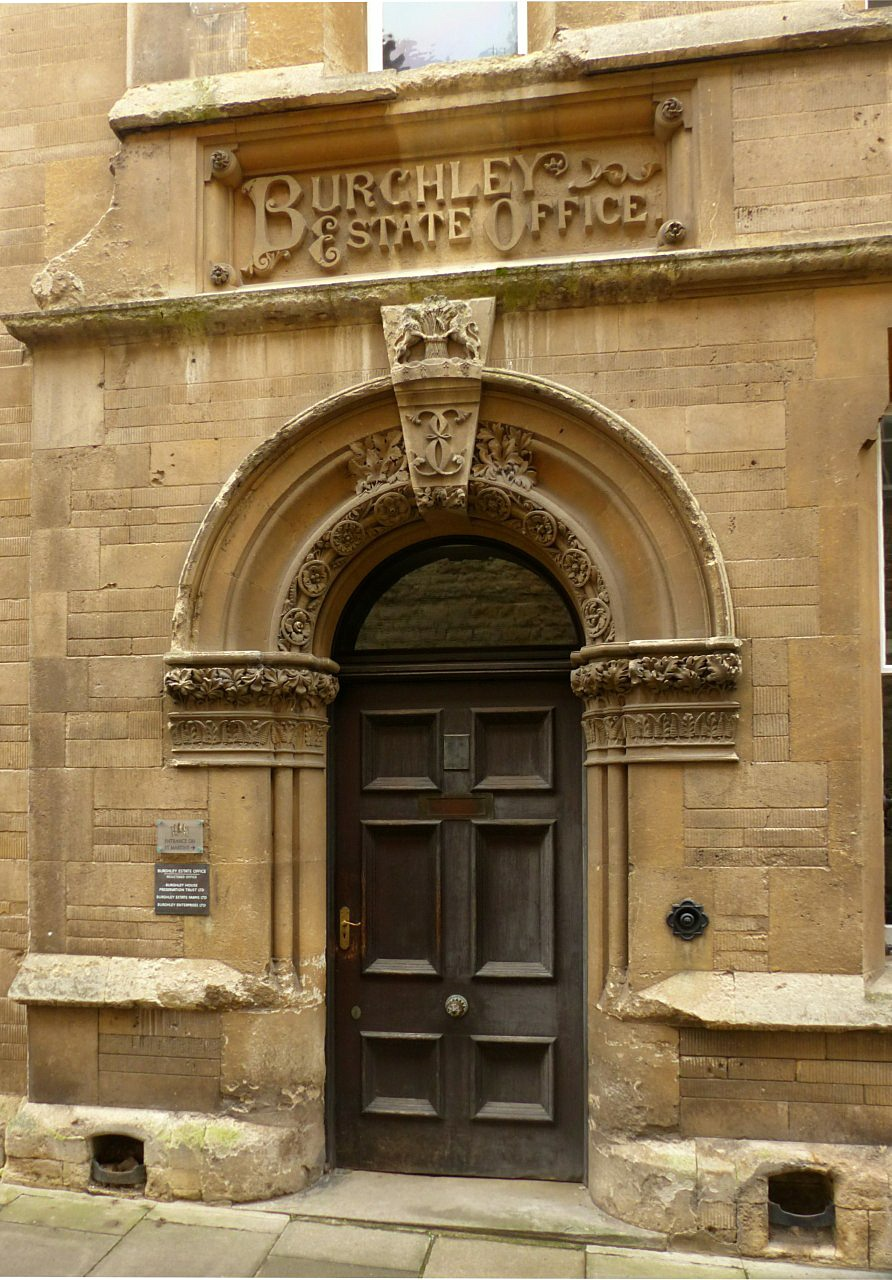
Burghley Estate Office, Stamford

- Burghley Estate Office, High Street St Martins, Stamford, Lincolnshire. Built 1879, Listed Grade II.

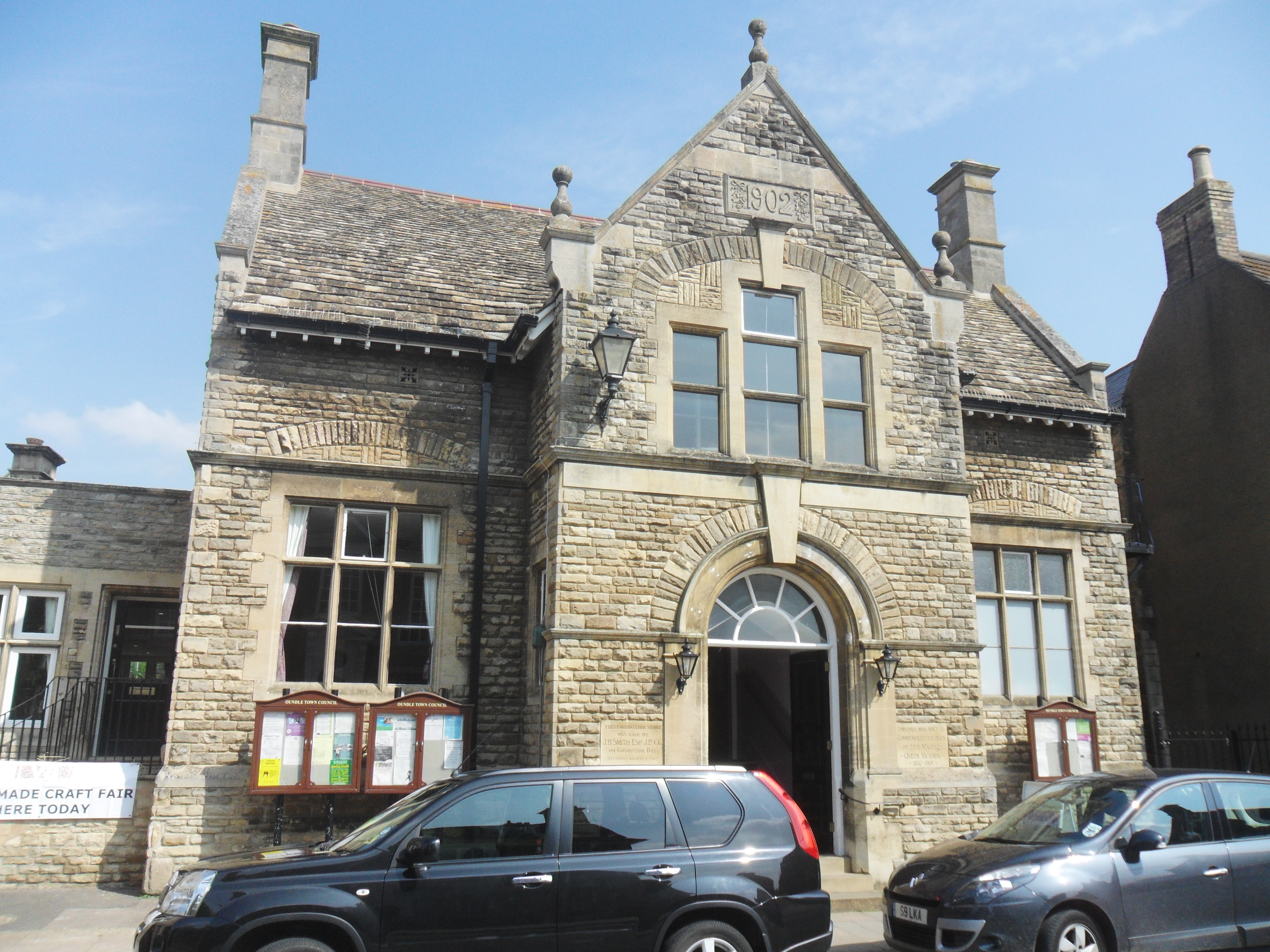
Queen Victoria Hall, Oundle

- Queen Victoria Hall, Oundle, Northamptonshire, sometimes referred to as the "Queen Victoria Town Hall". The foundation stone was laid in August 1902 and it was completed in 1904. It is stated to be by Corby in his obituary.
- Oddfellows Hall, 19-20 All Saints' Street, Stamford. Limestone ashlar pedimented gable with coat of arms and dated 1876. Below lettered ODD FELLOWS HALL and two round-arched windows and below a Romanesque Revival entrance. There was a 450-seat hall upstairs and a 250-seat hall downstairs at ground level. In 1909, films were screened in the upstairs hall and it was to become the PIcturedrome which closed in World War II. Now converted into flats.

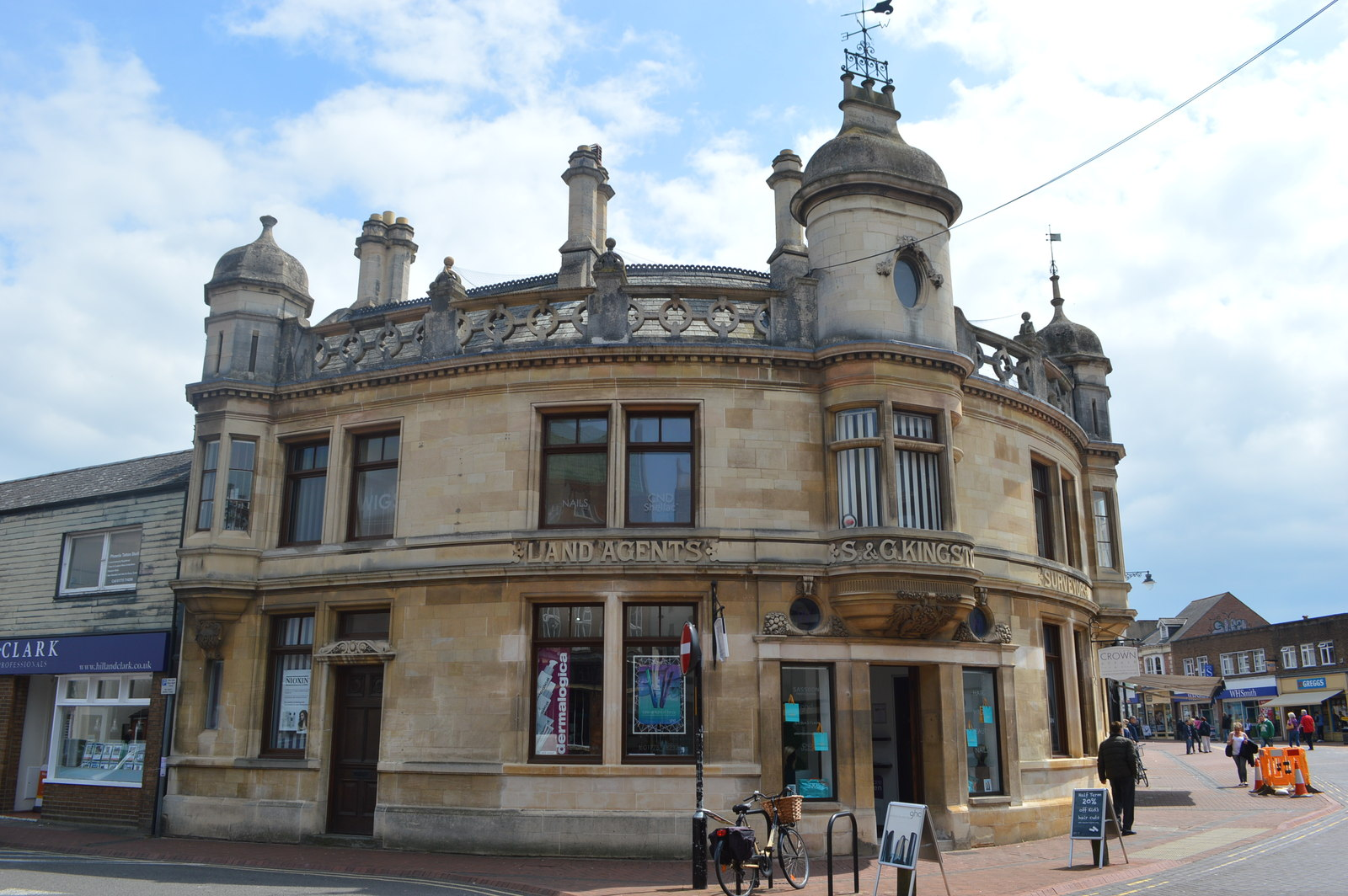
S&G Kingston - Land Agents and Surveyors

- Constitutional Clubroom, Barnack 1886. The builder selected for this project was W. Emerson of Stamford.
- Offices of S. & G. Kingston. New Street, Spalding. Elizabethan revival, ashlar faced, with oriel windows and rising into turrets and a strapwork balustrade.
- Museum of the Spalding Gentlemen's Society, Broad Street, Spalding.The museum was built in 1910 to a design by the architects J. B. Corby and Sons. It is constructed of red brick with ashlar dressings, with a slate roof, and is of two storeys. There are various inscribed labels.

=== Hospitals and almshouses ===
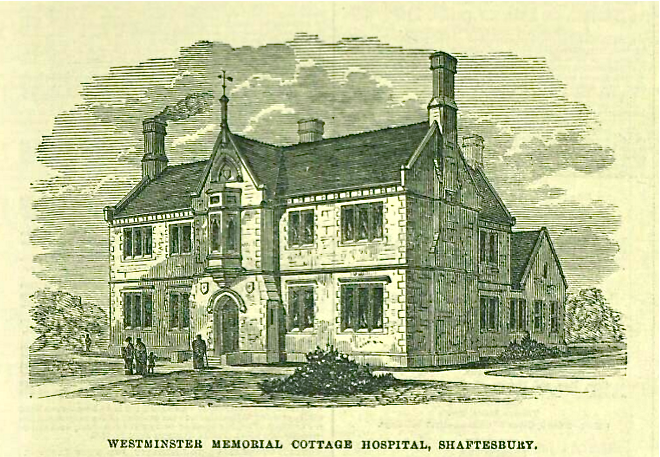
Westminster Memorial Cottage Hospital, Shaftesbury 1871

- Westminster Memorial Hospital, Shaftesbury, England, 1871. Corby's design was won an architectural competition, in which there were 42 entries sent in. Five bay ashlar fronted in Tudoresque revival style with advanced porch with oriel window at first floor level. Built to commemorate the late Marquis of Westminster. The hospital is now much extended, but still serves as a cottage hospital for Shaftesbury.
- Cornford Houses, King's Cliffe, Northamptonshire. 1891. Almshouses.
- Kingston Cottage Homes, South Parade, Spalding, 1905/7. Four red-brick tudoresque almshouses with fish-scale tiled roofs around a courtyard and chimneys, with strapwork and crenulations.

=== School ===
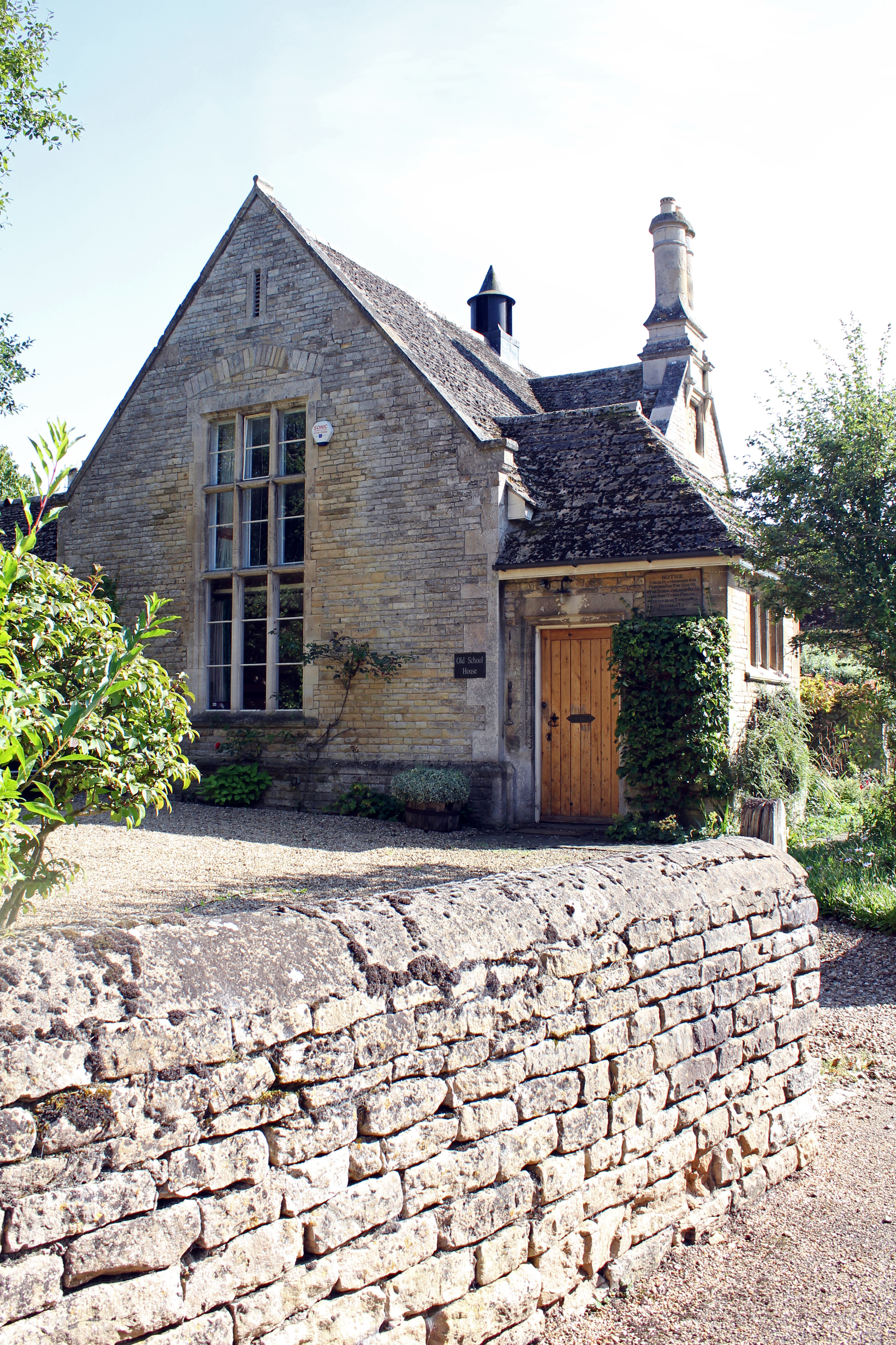
The Old School House, High Street, Duddington 1891

- Duddington, Northamptonshire. Village School. Designed by J. B. Corby of Stamford and built in 1891–2 by W. Goddard Jackson.

=== Chapels ===
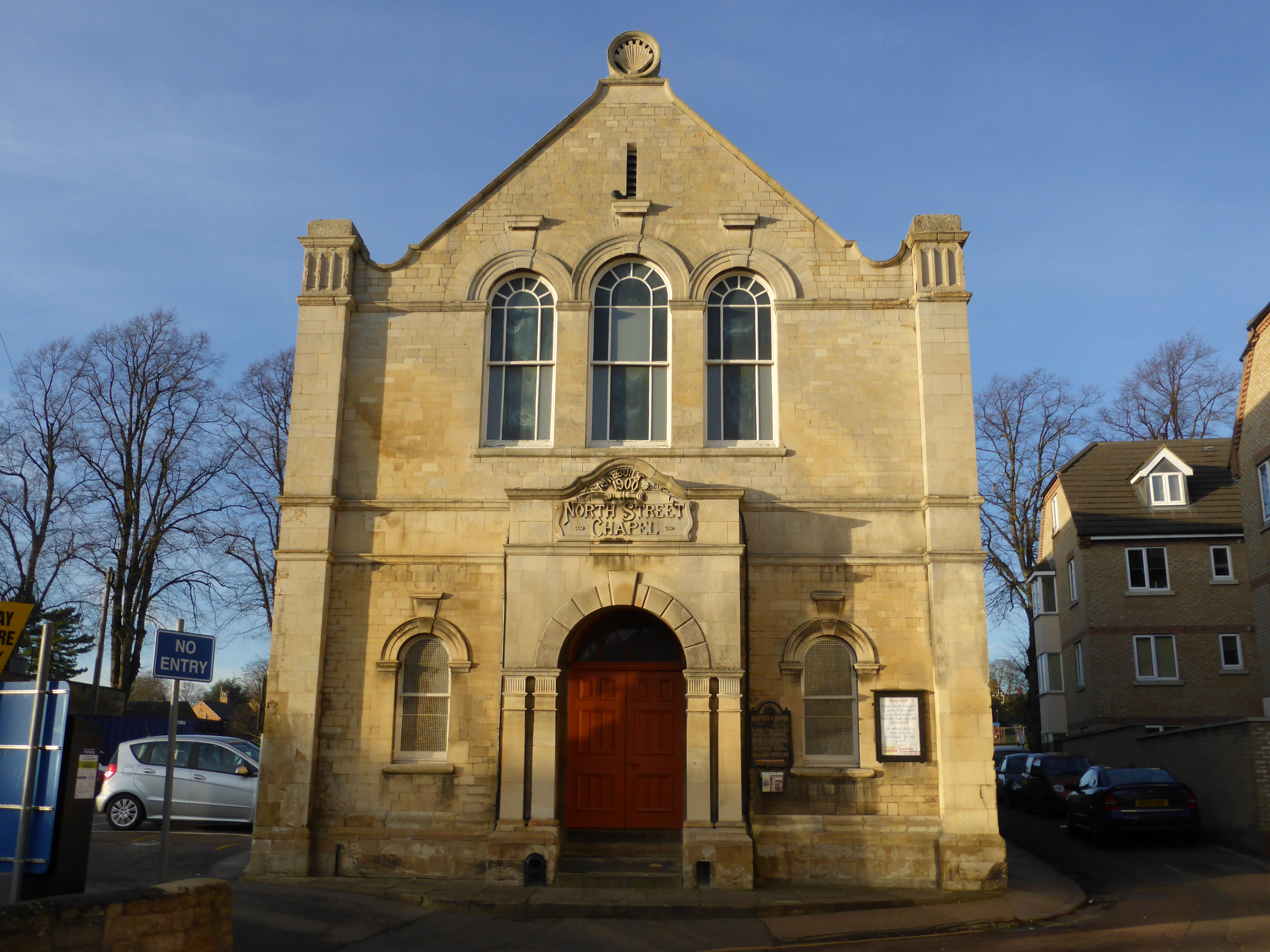
Baptist Chapel, North Street, Stamford. 1900

- Wesleyan Chapel, Lytchett Minster, Poole. 1865.
- Christadelphian Chapel, Spalding.
- Strict Baptist Chapel, Goldsmith's Passage, North Street, Stamford. 1900. Pevsner described the frontage as "Re-modelled and re-fronted in a coarse Italianate style", but in many respects may be considered as Baroque revival style with attractive use of Arts and Crafts lettering over the porch.

=== Church restorations ===
- St John the Baptist's Church, Wakerley, Northamptonshire. Church restoration in 1875.
- All Saints, Wainfleet, Lincolnshire. 1887. Rebuilding of the chancel and added north transept.

=== Houses ===
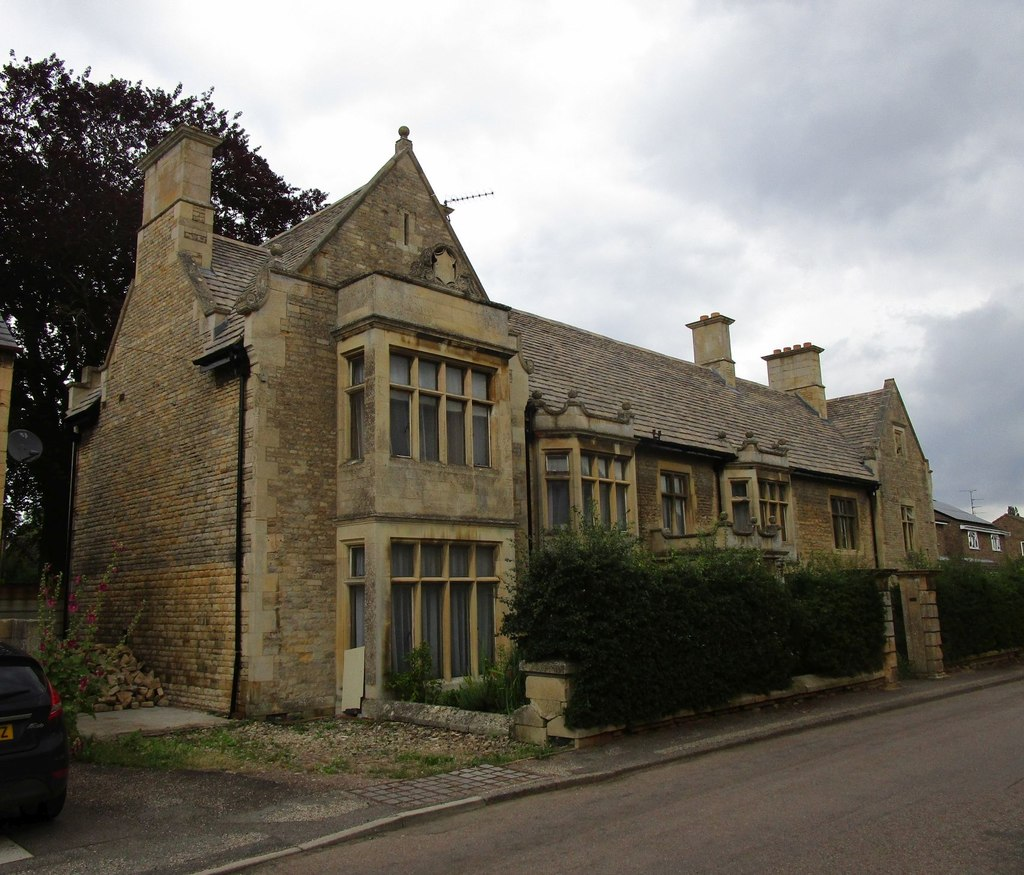
Rockbourne, Park Street, King's Cliffe 1900

- Rockbourne, Park Street, King's Cliffe. Northamptonshire 1900.

== Literature ==
- Antram N (revised), Pevsner N & Harris J, (1989), The Buildings of England: Lincolnshire, Yale University Press.
- Brodie A. (ed), (2001.) ‘’Directory of British Architects, 1834–1914’’: 2 Vols, British Architectural Library, Royal Institute of British Architects.
