= Spalding Gentlemen's Society =

Provincial English learned society

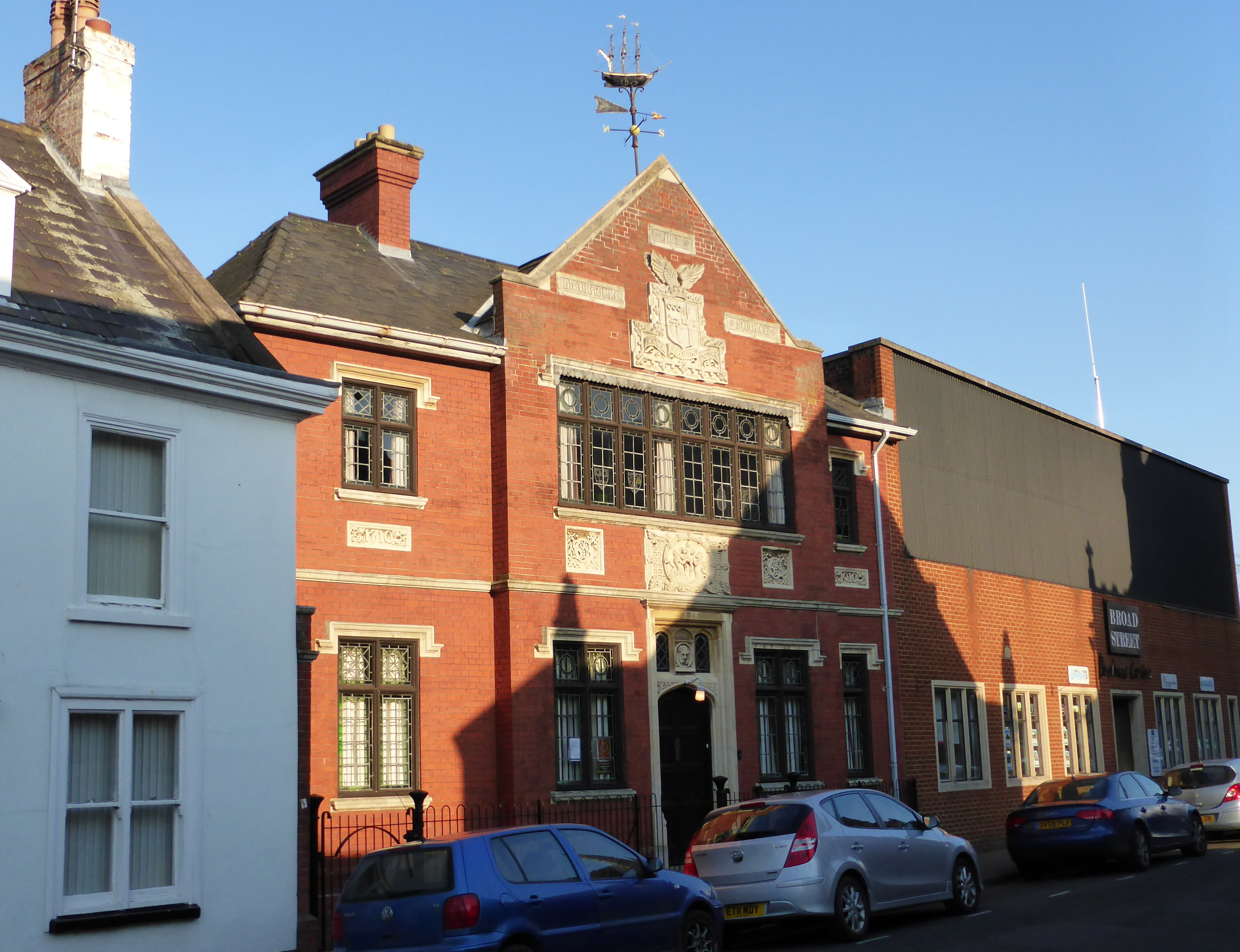
Spalding Gentlemen's Society building

The Spalding Gentlemen's Society is a learned society based in Spalding, Lincolnshire, England, concerned with cultural, scientific and antiquarian subjects. It is Britain's oldest such provincial body, founded in 1710 by Maurice Johnson (1688–1755) of Ayscoughfee Hall. Membership is open to anyone aged 18 or over: the term "gentlemen" in the title is historical – there is no discrimination between men and women. Its Grade II listed museum in Broad Street, Spalding, was designed by Joseph Boothroyd Corby and opened in 1911; additions to the building ensued in 1925 and 1960. The carved outside panels were by Jules Tuerlinckx of Malines, a Belgian refugee in the First World War, and likely a grandson of Flemish sculptor Joseph Tuerlinckx.

== History ==
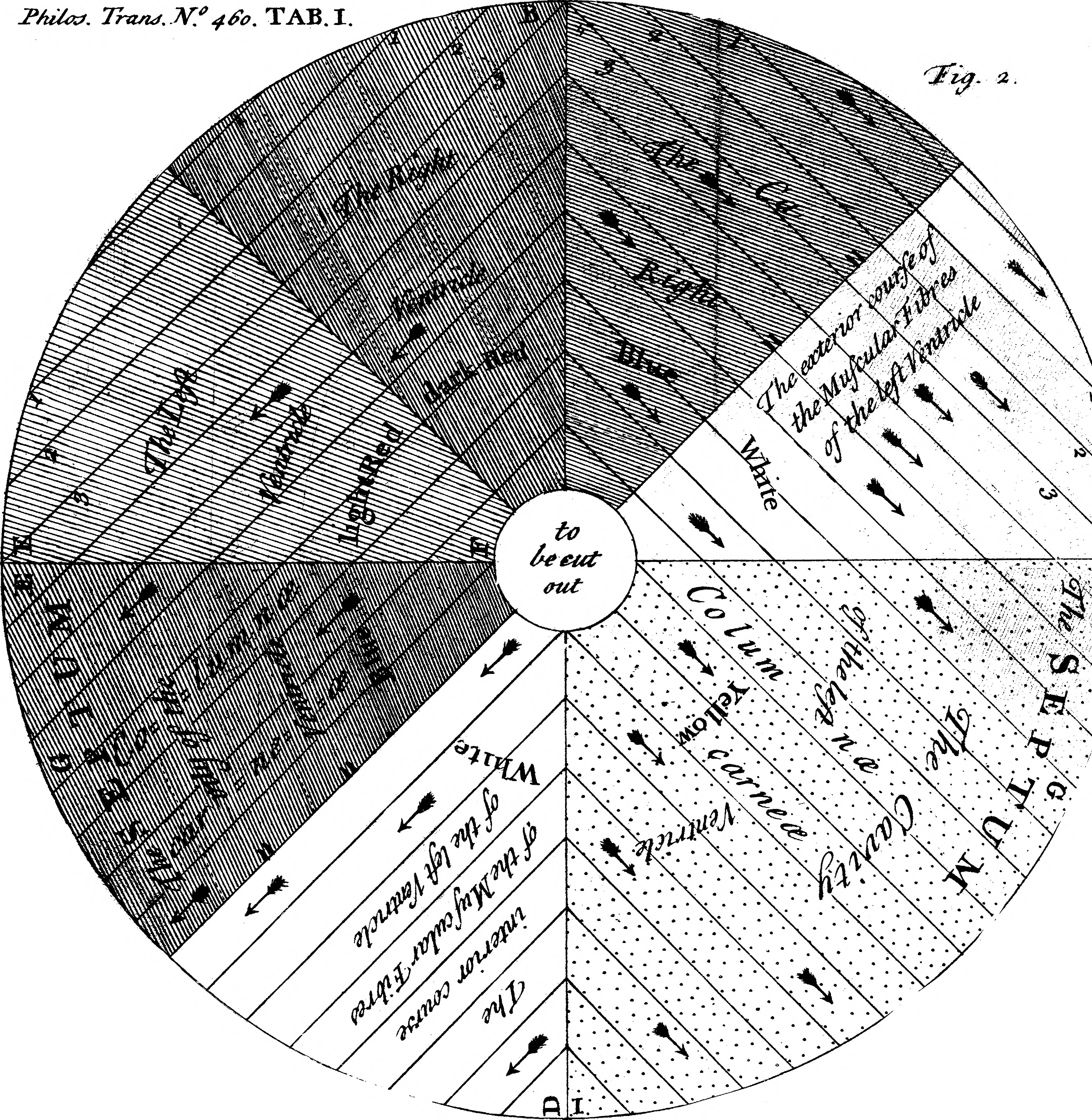
A Letter from Cromwell Mortimer, M.D. Fellow of the Royal College of Physicians London, Secretary to the Royal Society of London, Member of the Gentlemen's Society at Spalding, &c. to William Bogdani, (14592358717)

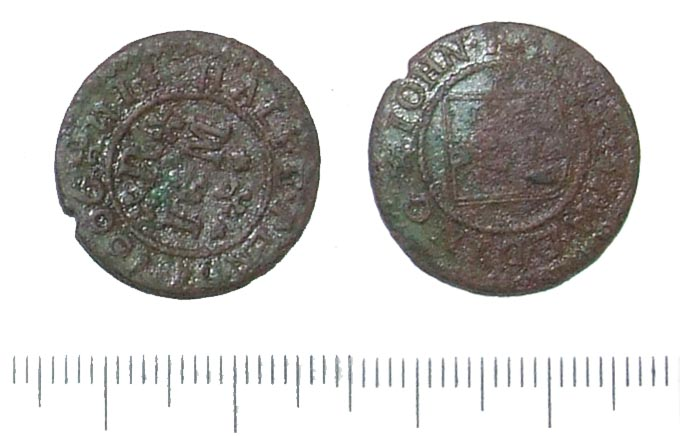
Jetton of John Ray, who was grandfather of the Rev. Benjamin Ray, Perpetual Curate of Cowbit and Surfleet (elected a member of the Spalding Gentlemen's Society in 1723), and a relative of the founder, Maurice Johnson

The Spalding Gentlemen's Society started in 1710 with informal meetings of a few gentlemen at a local coffee house in Spalding called Youngers. Many gentlemen's clubs formed in this way around that time. They talked about local antiquities and discussed the popular London newspaper The Tatler. In 1712 the society was organised in a more formal way as a Society of Gentlemen, for the supporting of mutual benevolence, and their improvement in the liberal sciences and in polite learning. Officers were appointed and minutes were kept. Francis Scott, 2nd Duke of Buccleuch (1695–1751), became Patron in 1732.

Records of the society's earliest activities have been published by the Lincoln Record Society as The Correspondence of the Spalding Gentlemen's Society, 1710–1761 and Minute-Books of The Spalding Gentlemen's Society, 1712–1755. Later works appear in catalogues as produced by "Spalding Gentleman's Society" in 1892 and 1893.

== Notable members ==
Noteworthy and early members of the "Gentlemen's Society at Spalding" include:

- Sir Isaac Newton. Stukeley's unpublished memoir of Newton mentions his joining the society, and making a substantial donation of books.
- Ayuba Suleiman Diallo, freed slave, Muslim cleric and aristocrat from Senegal
- Dr William Stukeley, cleric and antiquary
- Sir Hans Sloane, President of the Royal Society, whose museum and library formed the nucleus of the British Museum
- "Honest Tom" Martin, antiquary
- Alexander Pope, poet
- Alexander Gordon, antiquary
- Sir Joseph Banks, naturalist and botanist
- Emanuel Mendes da Costa, botanist and conchologist
- Sir George Gilbert Scott, Gothic Revival architect
- Alfred, Lord Tennyson, Poet Laureate
- George Vertue, engraver
- Joseph Ayloffe, antiquary
- John Anstis, F.R.S. Garter King of Arms
- John Gay, the poet
- Rev. Richard Bentley, D.D., classical scholar
- Captain John Perry, engineer
- Pishey Thompson, historian of Boston
- Andrew Michael Ramsay, Scottish writer
- Lord Curzon of Kedleston
- Lord Peckover, Quaker banker and philanthropist of Wisbech
- Lord Ancaster, the Society's Patron from 1960 to 1983
- Francis Bellinger, LRCP, (d. 1721), English physician

=== Gallery ===
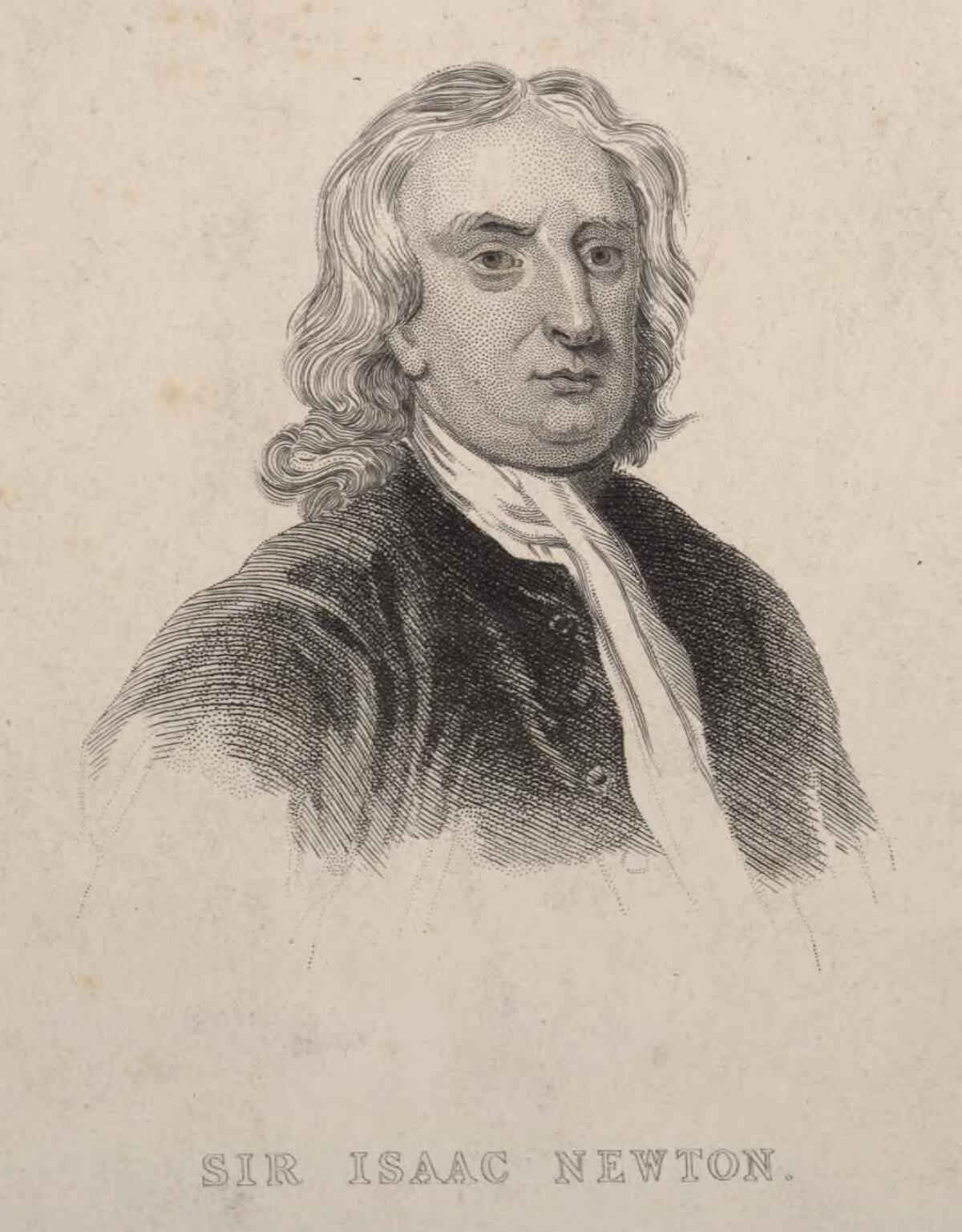
Isaac Newton

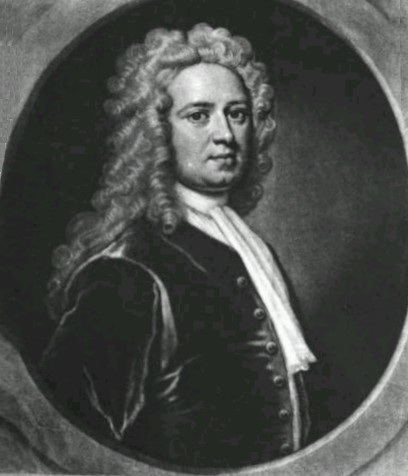
William Stukeley

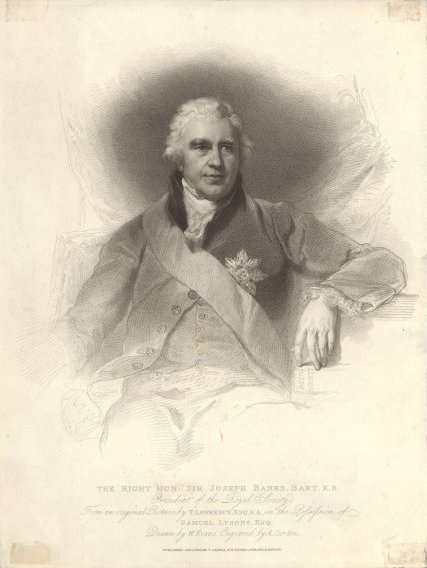
Joseph Banks

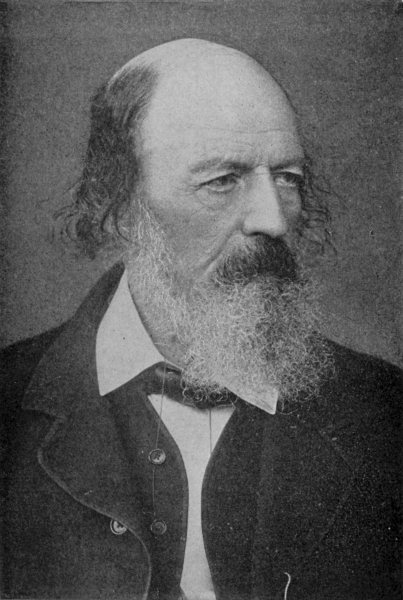
Alfred, Lord Tennyson

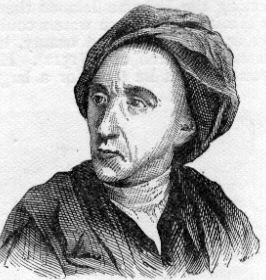
Alexander Pope

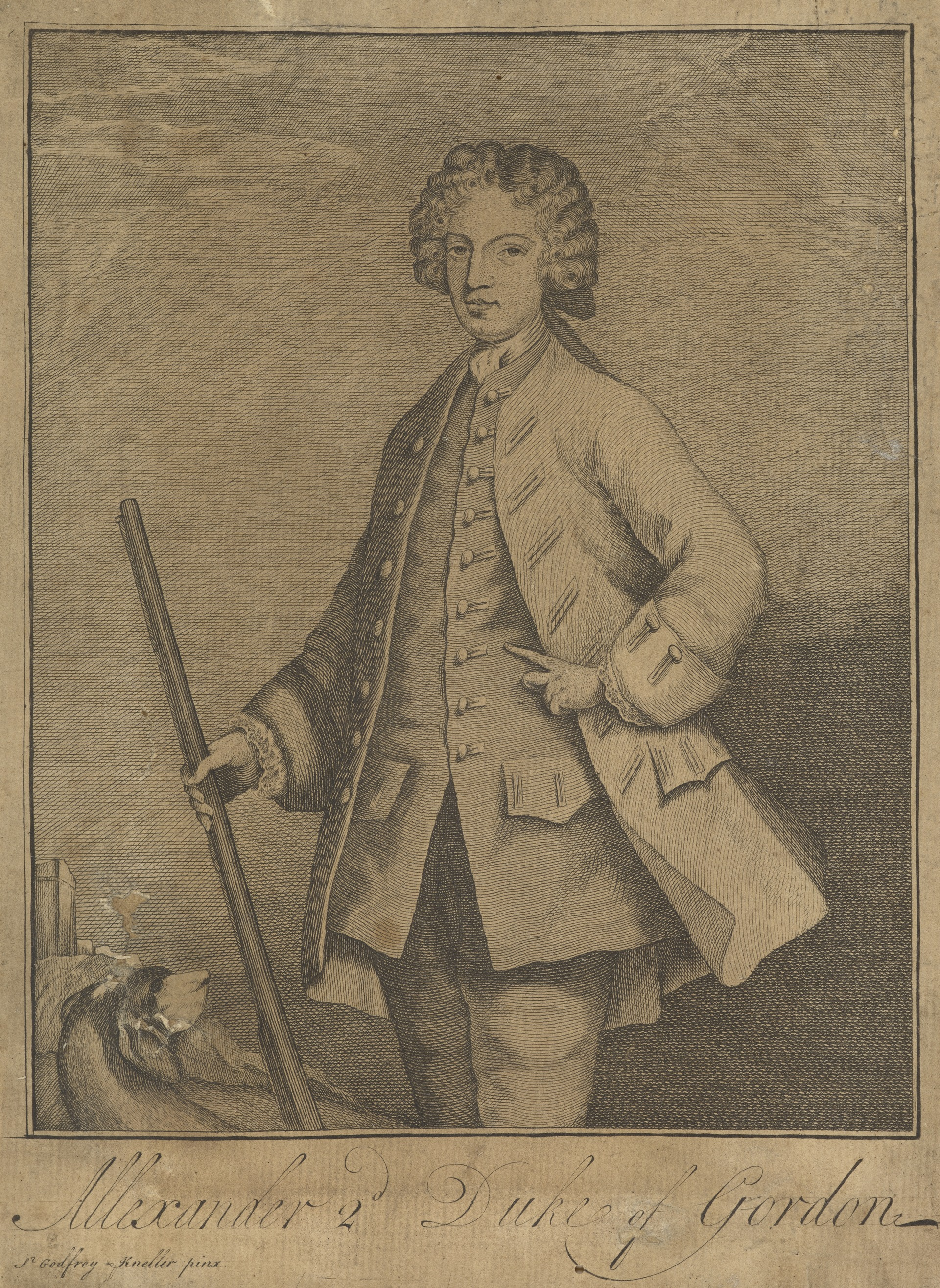
Alexander Gordon

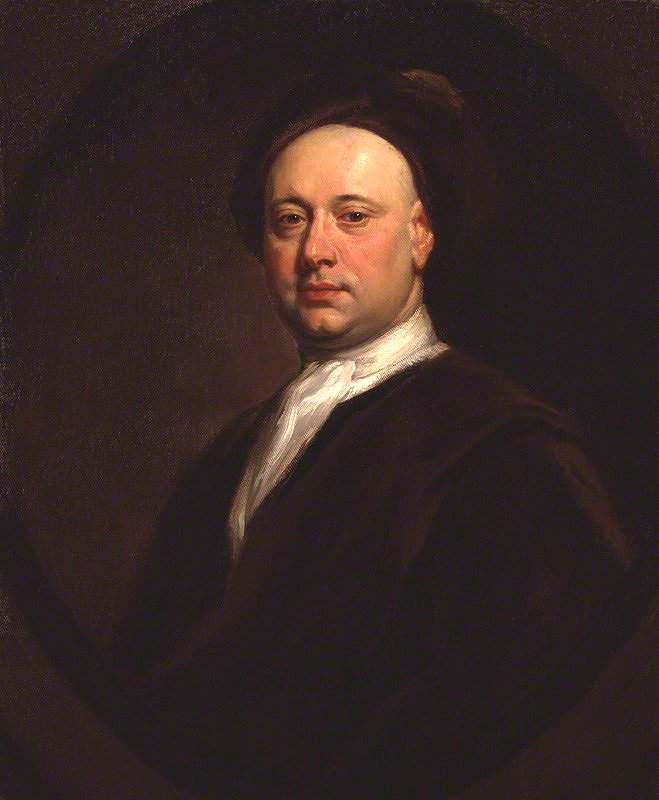
George Vertue

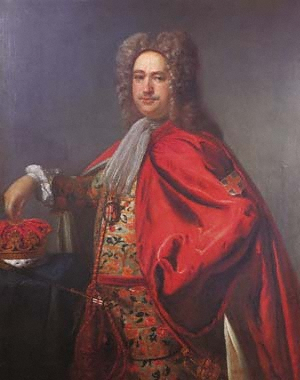
John Anstis

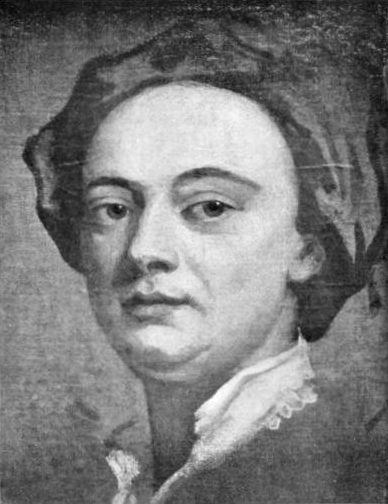
John Gay

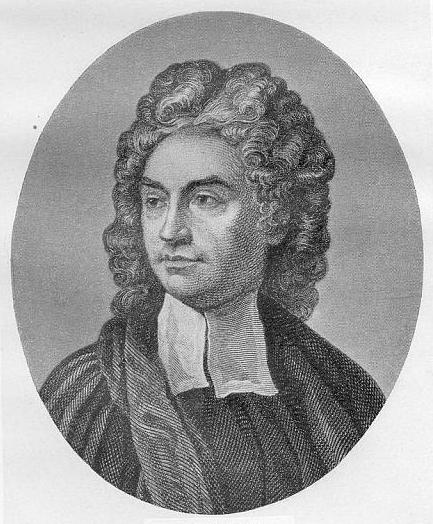
Richard Bentley

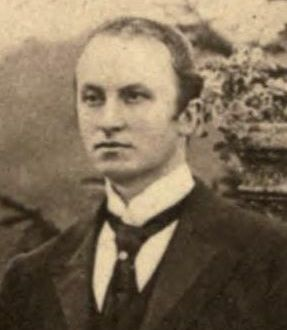
Lord Curzon
