= St John the Baptist's Church, Wakerley =

Coordinates: 52.5823°N 0.5894°W

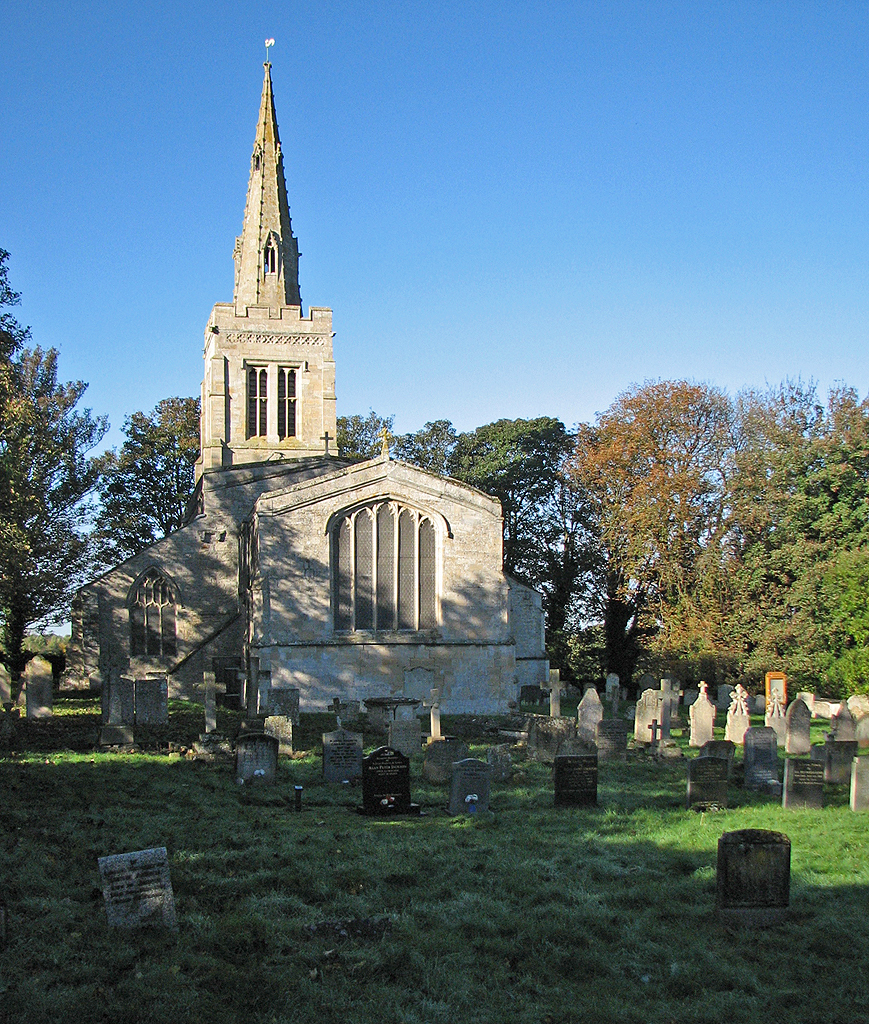
- St John the Baptist's Church, Wakerley, from the east

- Location in Northamptonshire
- OS grid reference: SP 956 992
- Location: Wakerley, Northamptonshire
- Country: England
- Denomination: Anglican
- Website: Churches Conservation Trust

History
- Dedication: Saint John the Baptist

Architecture
- Functional status: Redundant
- Heritage designation: Grade I
- Designated: 23 May 1967
- Architectural type: Church
- Style: Norman, Gothic
- Groundbreaking: 12th century
- Completed: 15th century

Specifications
- Materials: Limestone, roofs in lead and Collyweston stone slate

St John the Baptist's Church is a redundant Anglican church in the village of Wakerley, Northamptonshire, England. It is recorded in the National Heritage List for England as a designated Grade I listed building, and is under the care of the Churches Conservation Trust. It stands in an elevated position overlooking the Welland Valley.

== History ==
The church originated in the 12th century, with additions and alterations in the 13th, 14th and 15th centuries. It was restored in 1875 by J. B. Corby. The church was declared redundant on 3 March 1972, and was vested in the Churches Conservation Trust on 6 September 1974.

== Architecture ==
=== Exterior ===
St John's is constructed in limestone, with roofs in lead and Collyweston stone slate. Its plan consists of a four-bay nave with a clerestory, two-bay north and south aisles, and a north porch, a chancel, and a west tower. The tower is in four stages with angle buttresses. In its lowest stage is a two-light west window. In the top stage are pairs of two-light bell openings. Above these is a frieze and a battlemented parapet. Set back on the tower is an octagonal crocketed spire with lucarnes in two tiers. The south side of the chancel has two two-light windows with a priest's door between them. The east window has five lights and is in Perpendicular style. The east wall of the chancel has a shallow gable surmounted by a finial. The south aisle has two two-light windows on its south side and a three-light east window. In the south wall of the nave to the west of the aisle is a two-light window and a blocked doorway. Along the clerestory are three two-light square-headed windows. The windows in the north aisle and on the north side of the clerestory are similar to those in the south aisle. On the west side of the north aisle is a porch.

=== Interior ===
The arcades are of two bays dating from the 14th and 15th centuries. The chancel arch dates from the 12th century. It is decorated with chevrons and now has a pointed arch, but this was probably originally round in Norman style. The capitals of the arch are "among the highlights of Northamptonshire Romanesque", and "some of the finest in England". There are also Norman corbels in the south aisle and elsewhere in the church. In the chancel is an ogee-headed piscina to the right of the altar, and there is another piscina in the south aisle. The font dates from the late 13th century. The reredos and the floor of the sanctuary are composed of 19th-century tiles. The windows of the nave contain 14th-century stained glass and there is stained glass from the following century in the east windows of the aisles. The monuments include a chest tomb to Richard Cecil, the second son of William Cecil, 1st Baron Burghley, dating from about 1633. There are floor tablets in the chancel to sons of the Earls of Exeter.

== External features ==
In the churchyard is a limestone headstone dated 1668 which is designated as a Grade II listed building. Also in the churchyard and listed at Grade II is a chest tomb dated 1766.

Other graves include that of Lady Mary Theresa Montagu Douglas Scott (4 March 1904 – 1 June 1984), the first wife of David Cecil, later 6th Marquess of Exeter.

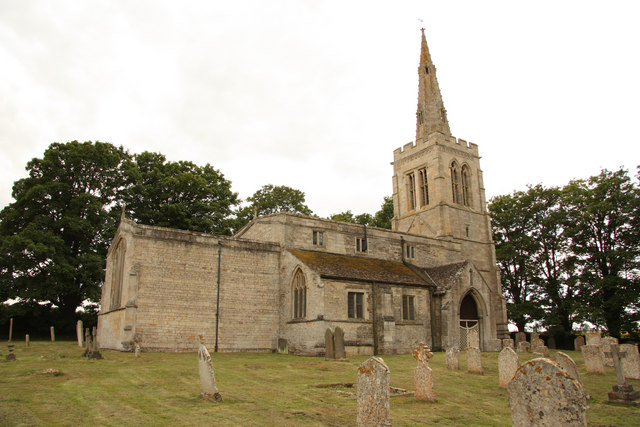
View from the north

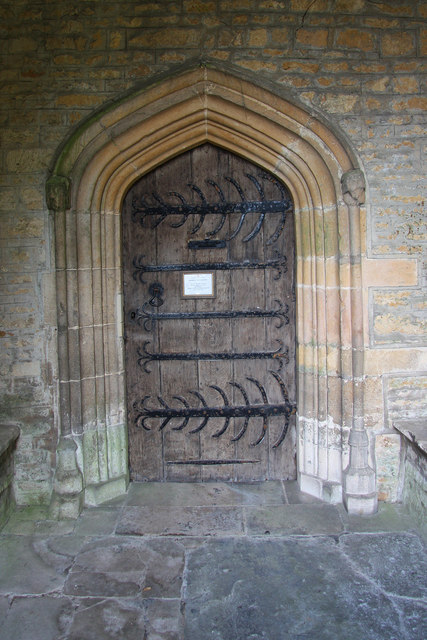
North doorway

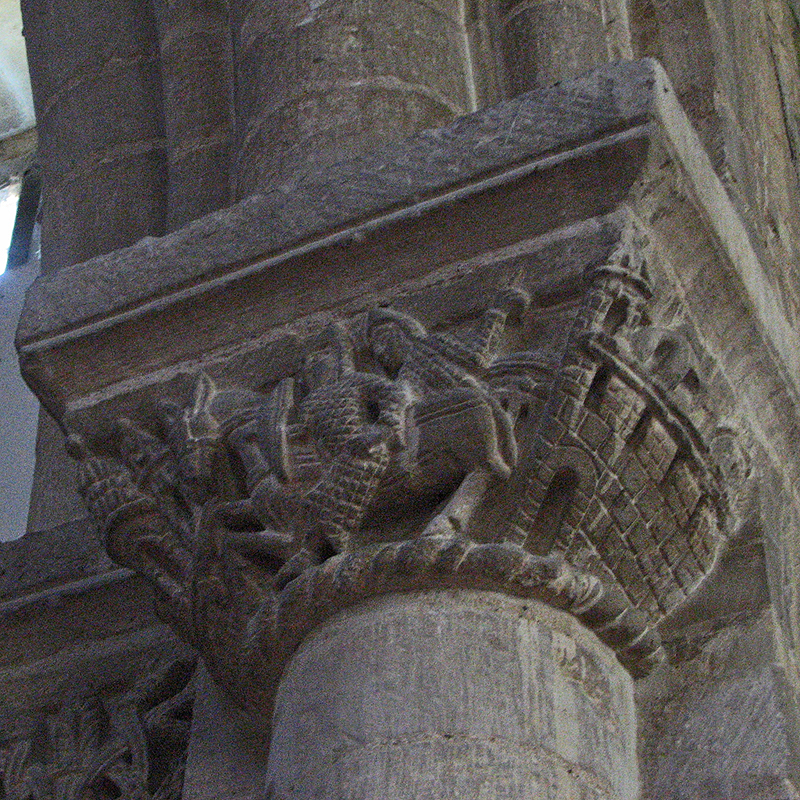
Norman carving on capital

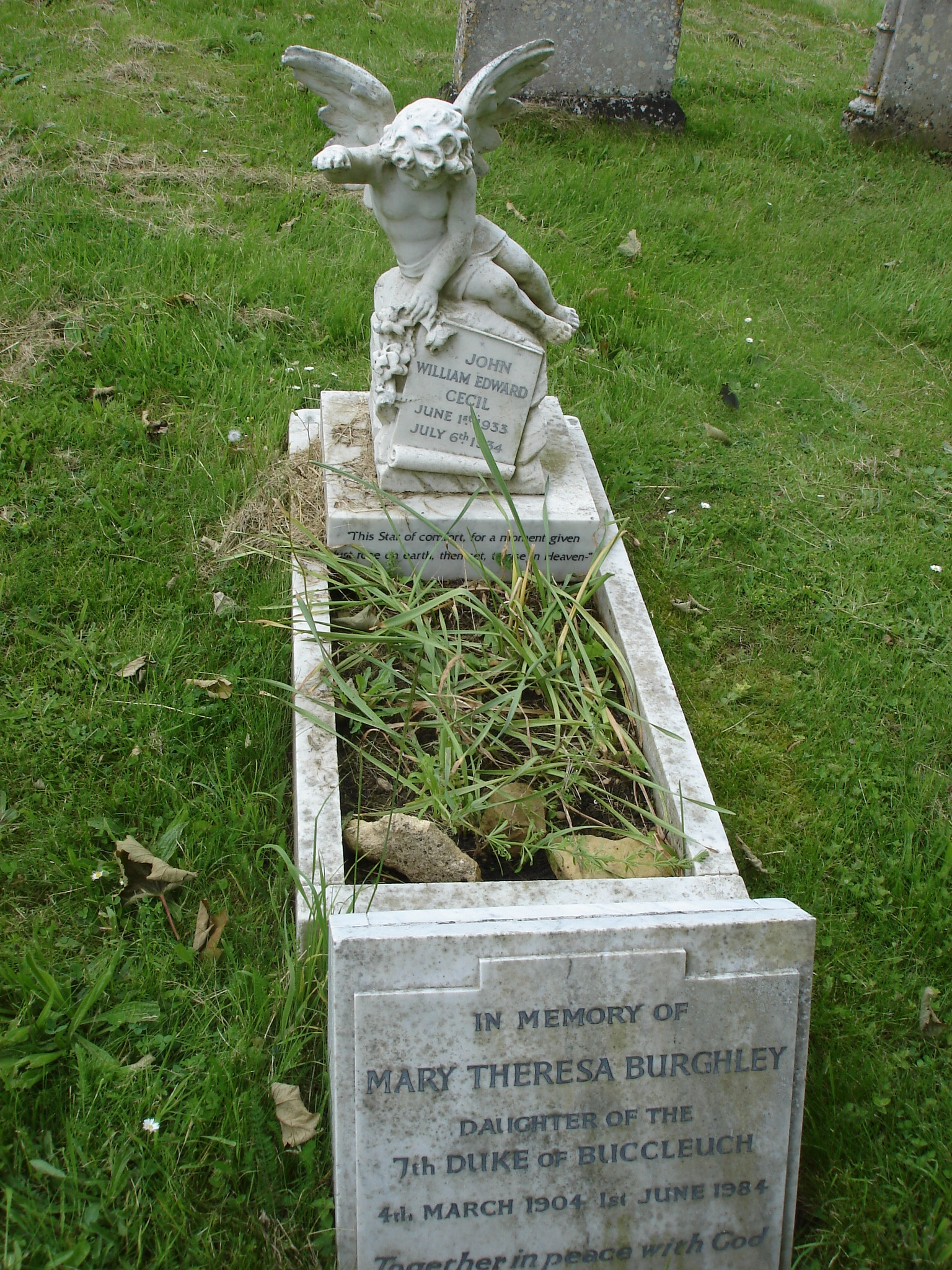
Grave of Maria Theresa Burghley, first wife of David Cecil, Lord Burghley

== See also ==
- List of churches preserved by the Churches Conservation Trust in the English Midlands
