= Francis Bellinger =

English physician

Francis Bellinger (died September 1721) was an English physician. He was educated at Brasenose College, Oxford and was admitted licentiate of the Royal College of Physicians on 29 March 1708. He practised at Stamford, and afterwards in London. He was an original member of the Spalding Gentlemen's Society.

He was author of A Discourse concerning the Nutrition of the Foetus in 1717 and also published work on smallpox shortly before his death.

== Works ==
- A treatise concerning the small-pox In which a plain and easy method of curing that disease under its most direful symptoms, is discover'd. ... In a letter, written in the year 1716, to the learned Dr. John Bateman, 1716
- Tractatus de foetu nutrito; or, A discourse concerning the nutrition of the foetus in the womb, demonstrated to be by ways hitherto unknown. In which is likewise discover'd the use of the gland thymus, with an appendix: being some practical animadversions on the food of children newly born, and the management of the milk of women, 1717
