= Aggborough & Spennells =

Aggborough & Spennells is an electoral ward in Kidderminster, Wyre Forest, England. The ward elects three councillors to both Wyre Forest District Council and Kidderminster Town Council. The population of the ward at the 2011 census was 8,779.

== Governance ==
Aggborough & Spennells is in the parliamentary constituency of Wyre Forest. Currently all three councillors: Helen Dyke, Peter Dyke & John Aston are all independent.

Election	Councillor	Councillor	Councillor
2019	Helen Dyke (Ind)	Peter Dyke (Ind)	John Aston (Ind)
2008	Helen Dyke (LD)	Peter Dyke (LD)	John Aston (Con)
2007	Helen Dyke (LD)	Peter Dyke (LD)	John Aston (Con)
2006	Helen Dyke (LD)	Peter Dyke (LD)	John Aston (Con)
2004	Helen Dyke (LD)	Peter Dyke (LD)	Maureen Aston (Con)
2003	Keith Robertson (Hea)	Peter Dyke (LD)	?
2002	Keith Robertson (Hea)	?	?
