= Shropshire Council elections =

Local government elections in Shropshire, England

Shropshire Council elections are held every four years, and since 2025, 74 councillors have been elected from 72 electoral divisions.

Shropshire Council is the unitary authority for the district of Shropshire, within the larger ceremonial county of Shropshire, England. The council was created in 1889 as Salop County Council, and was the upper tier of government in the two-tier metropolitan county between 1974 and 2009. On 1 April 2009, as part of the 2009 structural changes to local government in England, Shropshire's districts were abolished and the county council took over their functions. The Telford and Wrekin district had already become a separate unitary authority in 1998.

== Council elections ==
=== Non-metropolitan county elections ===
- 1973 Salop County Council election
- 1977 Salop County Council election
- 1981 Shropshire County Council election
- 1985 Shropshire County Council election
- 1989 Shropshire County Council election
- 1993 Shropshire County Council election
- 1997 Shropshire County Council election
- 2001 Shropshire County Council election
- 2005 Shropshire County Council election (boundary changes increased the number of seats by 4)

=== Unitary authority elections ===
Year	Conservative	Liberal Democrats	Reform	Labour	Green	Health Concern	Independent	Council control after election
2009	54	11	–	7	0	1	1	Conservative
2013 (Note: Boundary changes took place but the number of seats remained the same.)	48	12	–	9	0	1	4	Conservative
2017	49	12	–	8	1	1	3	Conservative
2021	43	14	–	9	4	–	4	Conservative
2025 (Note: Boundary changes took place but the number of seats remained the same.)	7	42	16	4	4	–	1	Liberal Democrats

==== Result maps ====
2005 results map

2009 results map

2013 results map

2017 results map

2021 results map

2025 results map

== By-election results ==
By-elections for individual seats can occur during a council's four-year term, for instance when a councillor dies or resigns their seat.

=== 1997–2001 ===
Bayston Hill By-Election 22 July 1999
Party	Candidate	Votes	%	±%
Conservative		706	35.9	+35.9
Labour		651	33.1	−4.0
Liberal Democrats		612	31.1	−31.8
Majority		55	2.8	
Turnout		1,969	47.3	
Conservative gain from Liberal Democrats		Swing		

Meole Brace By-Election 26 October 2000
Party	Candidate	Votes	%	±%
Conservative		822	47.0	+21.8
Labour		778	44.5	+8.1
Liberal Democrats		150	8.6	−29.8
Majority		44	2.5	
Turnout		1,750	30.2	
Conservative gain from Liberal Democrats		Swing		

=== 2001–2005 ===
Shifnal By-Election 20 June 2002
Party	Candidate	Votes	%	±%
Conservative		914	56.2	+56.2
Independent		445	27.4	−8.5
Independent		218	13.4	+0.0
Independent		50	3.0	−27.8
Majority		469	28.8	
Turnout		1,627	27.0	
Conservative gain from Independent		Swing		

Myddle By-Election 25 March 2004
Party	Candidate	Votes	%	±%
Conservative		1,457	50.3	+0.5
Liberal Democrats		1,441	49.7	−0.5
Majority		16	0.6	
Turnout		2,898	51.2	
Conservative gain from Liberal Democrats		Swing		

=== 2005–2009 ===
Oswestry By-Election 30 November 2006
Party	Candidate	Votes	%	±%
Conservative	Joyce Barrow	770	53.8	+22.4
Labour	Susan Crow	338	23.6	−14.7
Liberal Democrats	Henry Stevens	324	22.6	−7.7
Majority		432	30.2	
Turnout		1,432	15.0	
Conservative hold		Swing		

Whittington By-Election 30 November 2006
Party	Candidate	Votes	%	±%
Liberal Democrats	Trevor Davies	680	54.9	+54.9
Conservative	David Glyn	559	45.1	+18.2
Majority		121	9.8	
Turnout		1,239	24.9	
Liberal Democrats gain from Independent		Swing		

Market Drayton By-Election 5 June 2008
Party	Candidate	Votes	%	±%
Conservative	David Erwin	1,178	53.1	+0.6
Labour	Roger Walker	510	23.0	−24.5
Independent	Colin Phillips	362	16.3	+16.3
Independent	Michael Gould	170	7.7	+7.7
Majority		668	30.1	
Turnout		2,220	25.2	
Conservative hold		Swing		

=== 2009–2013 ===
Five by-elections were held during this term, which saw the Liberal Democrats gain three seats from the Conservatives.

Clee By-Election 1 July 2010
Party	Candidate	Votes	%	±%
Liberal Democrats	Richard Mark Huffer	946		
Conservative	Hayley Clare Fernihough	506		
Independent	Graeme Perks	116		
Majority		440		
Turnout		1568	43.11	
Liberal Democrats gain from Conservative		Swing		

Quarry and Coton Hill By-Election 17 February 2011
Party	Candidate	Votes	%	±%
Liberal Democrats	Andrew David Murray Bannerman	356		
Conservative	Judie McCoy	268		
Labour	John Olaf Lewis	197		
Independent	James Grimshaw Gollins	30		
Majority				
Turnout			30.47	
Liberal Democrats gain from Conservative		Swing		

Bishop's Castle By-Election 29 September 2011
Party	Candidate	Votes	%	±%
Liberal Democrats	Charlotte Ann Barnes	801		
Conservative	Georgiana Louise Dacre Ellis	544		
Labour	Jean Gray	80		
Green	Michael Richard Tucker	74		
Majority				
Turnout			51.3	
Liberal Democrats hold		Swing		

Abbey By-Election 1 March 2012
Party	Candidate	Votes	%	±%
Liberal Democrats	Hannah Fraser	550		
Conservative	Peter John Wright	542		
Green	John Robert Brown	122		
Majority				
Turnout			41.2	
Liberal Democrats gain from Conservative		Swing		

Church Stretton and Craven Arms By-Election 13 September 2012
Party	Candidate	Votes	%	±%
Conservative	Lee Chapman	1216		
Liberal Democrats	Robert Douglas Welch	969		
Labour	Clive Stephen Leworthy	529		
Majority				
Turnout			38	
Conservative hold		Swing		

=== 2013–2017 ===
Ludlow North By-Election 13 March 2014
Party	Candidate	Votes	%	±%
Liberal Democrats	Andy Boddington	579	45.3	+11.7
Conservative	Anthony Bevington	382	29.9	−10.5
Independent	Graeme Perks	223	17.4	+17.4
Labour	Danny Sweeney	94	7.4	−1.3
Majority		197	15.4	
Turnout		1,278		
Liberal Democrats gain from Conservative		Swing		

Oswestry East By-Election 12 February 2015
Party	Candidate	Votes	%	±%
Conservative	John Price	629	47.5	+17.0
Labour	Claire Norris	247	18.6	−10.2
Green	Duncan Kerr	231	17.4	+17.4
Liberal Democrats	Amanda Woof	218	16.5	+16.5
Majority		382	28.8	
Turnout		1,325		
Conservative hold		Swing		

Belle Vue By-Election 12 November 2015
Party	Candidate	Votes	%	±%
Labour	Amy Liebich	546	47.8	−28.7
Conservative	Andrew Wagner	282	24.7	+1.2
Liberal Democrats	Beverley Baker	240	21.0	+21.0
Green	Sam Taylor	75	6.6	+6.6
Majority		264	23.1	
Turnout		1,143		
Labour hold		Swing		

Meole By-Election 3 December 2015
Party	Candidate	Votes	%	±%
Conservative	Nic Laurens	490	43.1	−11.8
Labour	John Lewis	303	26.7	−11.0
Liberal Democrats	Nat Green	223	19.6	+12.3
UKIP	David Morgan	64	5.6	+5.6
Green	John Newnham	56	4.9	+4.9
Majority		187	16.5	
Turnout		1,136		
Conservative hold		Swing		

Oswestry South By-Election 4 February 2016
Party	Candidate	Votes	%	±%
Green	Duncan Kerr	518	48.8	+17.1
Conservative	Christopher Schofield	367	34.6	−11.4
Labour	Carl Hopley	95	9.0	+9.0
Liberal Democrats	Amanda Woof	81	7.6	+1.8
Majority		151	14.2	
Turnout		1,061		
Green gain from Conservative		Swing		

Bishop's Castle By-Election 12 September 2019
Party	Candidate	Votes	%	±%
Liberal Democrats	Ruth Houghton	838	71.4	−2.2
Conservative	Edward Thompson	229	19.5	−1.4
Labour	Andy Stelman	107	9.1	+9.1
Majority		609	51.9	
Turnout		1,174		
Liberal Democrats hold		Swing		

=== 2017–2021 ===
Shifnal South and Cosford By-Election 5 July 2018
Party	Candidate	Votes	%	±%
Conservative	Edward Bird	362	38.3	−18.8
Independent	Andy Mitchell	210	22.2	−9.3
Independent	David Carey	207	21.9	+21.9
Liberal Democrats	Jolyon Hartin	167	17.7	+6.3
Majority		152	16.1	
Turnout		946		
Conservative hold		Swing		

Belle Vue By-Election 25 April 2019
Party	Candidate	Votes	%	±%
Labour	Mary Halliday	603	47.1	+4.1
Liberal Democrats	James McLeod	403	31.5	+3.2
Conservative	Ross George	152	11.9	−12.3
Green	Dave Latham	65	5.1	+0.6
UKIP	Bob Oakley	58	4.5	+4.5
Majority		200	15.6	
Turnout		1,281		
Labour hold		Swing		

Meole By-Election 15 August 2019
Party	Candidate	Votes	%	±%
Conservative	Gwendoline Burgess	438	37.6	−17.8
Liberal Democrats	Adam Fejfer	309	26.5	+14.4
Labour	Darrell Morris	286	24.6	−2.9
Green	Emma Bullard	131	11.3	+6.3
Majority		129	11.1	
Turnout		1,164		
Conservative hold		Swing		

Bishop's Castle By-Election 12 September 2019
Party	Candidate	Votes	%	±%
Liberal Democrats	Ruth Houghton	838	71.4	−2.2
Conservative	Edward Thompson	229	19.5	−1.4
Labour	Andy Stelman	107	9.1	+9.1
Majority		609	51.9	
Turnout		1,174		
Liberal Democrats hold		Swing		

=== 2021–2025 ===
Highley By-Election 23 June 2022
Party	Candidate	Votes	%	±%
Liberal Democrats	Mark Williams	630	54.5	+54.5
Conservative	Naomi Waterson	279	24.1	−9.5
Labour	Liam Atwal	239	20.7	+7.3
Green	Clare Nash	9	0.8	+0.8
Majority		351	30.3	
Turnout		1,157		
Liberal Democrats gain from Independent		Swing		

Bridgnorth West and Tasley By-Election 6 October 2022
Party	Candidate	Votes	%	±%
Labour	Rachel Connolly	887	55.9	+6.0
Conservative	Jonathan Holland	480	30.2	−4.6
Liberal Democrats	Richard Stilwell	176	11.1	−1.6
Green	Clare Nash	45	2.8	+0.2
Majority		407	25.6	
Turnout		1,588		
Labour gain from Conservative		Swing		

Worfield By-Election 7 September 2023
Party	Candidate	Votes	%	±%
Liberal Democrats	Andrew Sherrington	400	48.1	+33.5
Conservative	Michael Wood	392	47.1	−27.9
Labour	Shanthi Flynn	40	4.8	+4.8
Majority		8	1.0	
Turnout		832		
Liberal Democrats gain from Conservative		Swing		

Alveley and Claverley By-Election 19 October 2023
Party	Candidate	Votes	%	±%
Liberal Democrats	Colin Taylor	662	58.8	+36.6
Conservative	Jonathan Davey	408	36.3	−33.0
Labour	Ann Philp	55	4.9	+4.9
Majority		254	22.6	
Turnout		1,125		
Liberal Democrats gain from Conservative		Swing		

== See also ==
- Telford and Wrekin local elections

Former councils in Shropshire:

- Bridgnorth local elections
- North Shropshire local elections
- Oswestry local elections
- Shrewsbury and Atcham local elections
- South Shropshire local elections
