= 2014 Wyre Forest District Council election =

2014 UK local government election

Map of the results of the 2014 Wyre Forest District Council election. Conservatives in blue, UK Independence Party in purple, Labour in red, Health Concern in pink and independent in light grey. Wards in dark grey were not contested in 2014.

The 2014 Wyre Forest District Council election took place on 22 May 2014 to elect members of Wyre Forest District Council in Worcestershire, England. One third of the council was up for election and the council stayed under no overall control.

After the election, the composition of the council was:

- Conservative 15
- Labour 9
- Health Concern 7
- UK Independence Party 5
- Independent 4
- Liberal 2

== Background ==
Between the last election in 2012 and the 2014 election there were several changes in the political composition due to defections. Only weeks after the 2012 election, Offmore and Comberton councillor Rose Bishop defected from the Liberals to the Conservatives, taking the Conservatives to exactly half of the seats on the council, with 21 councillors. However, in May 2013 the Conservative councillor for Aggborough and Spennells, John Aston, left the party to sit as an independent after failing to be backed by the Conservatives for the position of vice chairman of the council. Also in May 2013 the Conservative councillor for Mitton, Mike Salter, left the party to become an independent, and then went on to join Health Concern later that year.

Finally in March 2014, the councillor for Bewdley and Arley Julian Phillips quit the Conservative party to become an independent. These changes meant that before the 2014 election there were 18 Conservative councillors, 9 Health Concern, 8 Labour, 3 Liberals and 3 independents in the Liberal and Independent group, and one other independent councillor.

In April 2014 the council got a new leader after Conservative John Campion resigned and party colleague Marcus Hart was elected to succeed him.

== Candidates ==
14 seats were contested in 2014 with the successful candidates only being elected for one year as the whole council was being elected in 2015 after boundary changes. The Conservatives defended 8 of the 14 seats, with 2 cabinet members standing for re-election, John Campion and Ian Hardiman, while the former Liberal councillor Rose Bishop defended Offmore and Comberton as a Conservative. Of the remaining six seats contested, three were held by Health Concern, with Mike Salter defending Aggborough and Spennells for the party after his move from the Conservatives. However councillor Howard Martin stood in Broadwaters for Labour after originally being elected for Health Concern in 2010.

Independent John Aston stood in Aggborough and Spennells after his move from the Conservatives, while the final seat in Greenhill was held by Liberal Tim Ingham before the election. However Ingham stood in Offmore and Comberton at the 2014 election, leaving Rachel Lewis to defend Greenhill for the Liberal Party.

Meanwhile, the UK Independence Party did not have any seats before the election, but stood candidates for all 14 seats that were contested. They were joined by the Conservatives, Health Concern and Labour in contesting every seat, while the Liberal Party, Green Party, Trade Unionist and Socialist Coalition and an independent contested some of the seats.

== Election result ==
The UK Independence Party gained five seats, to get the party's first councillors on Wyre Forest District Council and they came within 100 votes of overtaking the Conservatives in the share of the vote. The gains came from the Conservatives in Franche and Oldington and Foley Park, from Labour in Broadwaters, in Mitton from Health Concern and in Greenhill from the Liberal Party. Despite losing three seats the Conservative Party remained the largest party on the council with 15 councillors, but Conservative cabinet member Ian Hardiman was defeated in Habberley and Blakebrook and the vice-chairman of the council Daniel McCann lost in Franche.

Labour became the second largest party on the council with 9 seats after gaining seats in Habberley and Blakebrook and Areley Kings. However they lost Broadwaters to the UK Independence Party and dropped to fourth in vote share with 18% of the vote. Health Concern lost two seats to have seven councillors but won the third most votes, while the Liberals lost a seat in Greenhill to have two councillors. Finally John Aston held Aggborough and Spennells as an independent, meaning there remained four independents on the council. Overall turnout at the election was 36%.

Following the election the unaffiliated independent councillor Julian Phillips joined the Liberal and Independent group, which then formed an alliance with the Conservatives to control the council. Between the 15 Conservatives, 4 independents and 2 Liberals they controlled exactly half of the seats on the council. Conservative Marcus Hart remained leader of the council, with the leader of the Liberal and Independent group Helen Dyke joining the council cabinet.

Wyre Forest local election result 2014
Party	Seats	Gains	Losses	Net gain/loss	Seats %	Votes %	Votes	+/−
Conservative	5	0	3	-3	35.7	26.2	6,715	-1.6
UKIP	5	5	0	+5	35.7	25.8	6,622	+22.5
Labour	2	2	1	+1	14.3	18.0	4,616	-8.0
Health Concern	1	0	2	-2	7.1	20.8	5,344	-10.4
Independent	1	0	0	0	7.1	3.3	836	-0.6
Liberal	0	0	1	-1	0.0	4.2	1,083	-1.2
Green	0	0	0	0	0.0	1.4	352	-0.9
TUSC	0	0	0	0	0.0	0.3	76	+0.3

== Ward results ==
Aggborough and Spennells
Party	Candidate	Votes	%	±%
Independent	John Aston	836	43.4	−6.6
Conservative	Andrew Tromans	330	17.1	+0.8
UKIP	Thomas Wooldridge	309	16.0	+16.0
Health Concern	Keith Robertson	248	12.9	−6.6
Labour	Conan Norton	155	8.0	−2.5
Green	Ronald Lee	50	2.6	−1.1
Majority		506	26.2	−4.2
Turnout		1,928	36.9	+5.5
Independent hold		Swing		

Areley Kings
Party	Candidate	Votes	%	±%
Labour	Robert Lloyd	557	30.6	−17.8
UKIP	Ian Jones	454	24.9	+24.9
Health Concern	Nigel Thomas	412	22.6	−6.6
Conservative	Kenneth Henderson	400	21.9	−0.4
Majority		103	5.7	−13.5
Turnout		1,823	38.9	+5.2
Labour gain from Health Concern		Swing		

Bewdley and Arley
Party	Candidate	Votes	%	±%
Conservative	Stephen Clee	622	27.0	−14.1
Health Concern	Derek Killingworth	583	25.3	−9.7
UKIP	John Boden	565	24.6	+24.6
Labour	George Court	408	17.7	−6.2
Green	Phillip Oliver	122	5.3	+5.3
Majority		39	1.7	−4.4
Turnout		2,300	43.7	+8.8
Conservative hold		Swing		

Blakedown and Chaddesley
Party	Candidate	Votes	%	±%
Conservative	Pauline Hayward	779	55.8	−22.8
UKIP	Adrian Dawes	278	19.9	+19.9
Health Concern	Louise Hinett	223	16.0	+16.0
Labour	Bernadette Connor	116	8.3	−4.2
Majority		501	35.9	−30.2
Turnout		1,396	42.6	−6.3
Conservative hold		Swing		

Broadwaters
Party	Candidate	Votes	%	±%
UKIP	Paul Wooldridge	634	32.9	+32.9
Labour	Howard Martin	476	24.7	−10.8
Health Concern	Peter Young	453	23.5	−14.3
Conservative	Sally Chambers	301	15.6	−1.3
Liberal	Esther Smart	63	3.3	−1.6
Majority		158	8.2	
Turnout		1,927	32.1	+4.6
UKIP gain from Labour		Swing		

Franche
Party	Candidate	Votes	%	±%
UKIP	Anthony Clent	572	28.9	+17.9
Conservative	Daniel McCann	550	27.8	+2.6
Health Concern	Caroline Shellie	475	24.0	−1.5
Labour	Leroy Wright	353	17.8	−16.4
TUSC	Nigel Gilbert	29	1.5	+1.5
Majority		22	1.1	
Turnout		1,979	35.3	+4.1
UKIP gain from Conservative		Swing		

Greenhill
Party	Candidate	Votes	%	±%
UKIP	Martin Stooke	540	29.5	+29.5
Health Concern	John Rayner	371	20.3	−11.8
Conservative	Ruth Gregory	331	18.1	+0.9
Labour	Mumshad Ahmed	275	15.0	−11.8
Liberal	Rachel Akathiotis	176	9.6	−9.0
Green	Victoria Lea	104	5.7	+0.4
TUSC	Ingra Kirkland	34	1.9	+1.9
Majority		169	9.2	
Turnout		1,831	30.4	+4.9
UKIP gain from Liberal		Swing		

Habberley and Blakebrook
Party	Candidate	Votes	%	±%
Labour	Lynn Hyde	663	33.3	−3.1
Conservative	Ian Hardiman	501	25.2	−3.9
UKIP	Peter Willoughby	474	23.8	+13.9
Health Concern	Anthony Greenfield	341	17.1	−5.3
TUSC	Kevin Young	13	0.7	+0.7
Majority		162	8.1	+0.8
Turnout		1,992	38.1	+3.5
Labour gain from Conservative		Swing		

Lickhill
Party	Candidate	Votes	%	±%
Health Concern	Dixon Sheppard	622	33.5	−19.4
UKIP	Berenice Dawes	482	26.0	+26.0
Conservative	David Little	466	25.1	−3.0
Labour	David Keogh-Smith	285	15.4	−3.7
Majority		140	7.5	−17.3
Turnout		1,855	33.9	+4.9
Health Concern hold		Swing		

Mitton
Party	Candidate	Votes	%	±%
UKIP	John Holden	667	32.7	+32.7
Health Concern	Michael Salter	595	29.2	−13.5
Conservative	Tony Muir	460	22.6	−11.4
Labour	Carol Warren	317	15.5	−1.2
Majority		72	3.5	
Turnout		2,039	34.1	+6.1
UKIP gain from Health Concern		Swing		

Offmore and Comberton
Party	Candidate	Votes	%	±%
Conservative	Rosemary Bishop	623	29.9	+13.9
UKIP	William Hopkins	558	26.7	+26.7
Liberal	Timothy Ingham	351	16.8	−26.8
Labour	Keith Budden	300	14.4	−0.7
Health Concern	Christopher Watkins	254	12.2	−13.0
Majority		65	3.2	
Turnout		2,086	38.5	+6.1
Conservative hold		Swing		

Oldington and Foley Park
Party	Candidate	Votes	%	±%
UKIP	Michael Wrench	338	34.3	+19.4
Conservative	Nichola Gale	244	24.8	−5.7
Labour	Samuel Arnold	236	24.0	−5.9
Health Concern	Susan Meekings	167	17.0	−5.2
Majority		94	9.5	
Turnout		985	26.9	+4.3
UKIP gain from Conservative		Swing		

Sutton Park
Party	Candidate	Votes	%	±%
Conservative	John-Paul Campion	517	27.7	−14.0
Liberal	David Hollyoak	458	24.5	+24.5
UKIP	Charlotte Stokes	398	21.3	+8.4
Health Concern	James Lawson	230	12.3	−9.5
Labour	Paul Connor	187	10.0	−10.1
Green	Michael Whitbread	76	4.1	+0.6
Majority		59	3.2	−16.7
Turnout		1,866	32.9	+6.2
Conservative hold		Swing		

Wribbenhall
Party	Candidate	Votes	%	±%
Conservative	Gordon Yarranton	591	36.1	+4.2
Health Concern	Linda Candlin	369	22.6	−14.4
UKIP	Maurice Alton	353	21.6	+21.6
Labour	George Jones	288	17.6	−13.6
Liberal	Michael Akathiotis	35	2.1	+2.1
Majority		222	13.5	
Turnout		1,636	40.4	+8.5
Conservative hold		Swing		
