= 2011 Wyre Forest District Council election =

2011 UK local government election

Map of the results of the 2011 Wyre Forest District Council election. Conservatives in blue, Labour in red, Health Concern in pink, Liberals in orange and independent in light grey. Wards in dark grey were not contested in 2011.

The 2011 Wyre Forest District Council election took place on 5 May 2011 to elect members of Wyre Forest District Council in Worcestershire, England. One third of the council was up for election and the Conservative Party stayed in overall control of the council.

After the election, the composition of the council was:

- Conservative 24
- Labour 6
- Liberal 5
- Health Concern 4
- Independent 3

== Background ==
After the last election in 2010 the Conservatives had a majority on the council with 23 seats, compared to 8 for Health Concern, 5 Liberals, 3 Labour, 2 Liberal Democrats and 1 independent. However, in late May 2010 the leader of Health Concern on the council, Howard Martin, left the party to sit as an independent and went on to join Labour in September 2010. Another change came in March 2011 when both of the Liberal Democrat councillors, husband and wife Peter and Helen Dyke, left the party to become independents due to disillusionment with the national Conservative-Liberal Democrat coalition.

== Election result ==
The Conservatives retained a majority on the council with 24 councillors and gained a seat from Health Concern in Mitton. Labour were the other party to make gains, taking an extra 2 seats, including gaining Areley Kings from Health Concern by 39 votes. This made Labour the second largest party on the council with six seats, while Health Concern dropped three to have four seats. Meanwhile, Peter Dyke held Aggborough and Spennells as an independent, after having left the Liberal Democrats earlier in the year.

Wyre Forest local election result 2011
Party	Seats	Gains	Losses	Net gain/loss	Seats %	Votes %	Votes	+/−
Conservative	7	1	0	+1	50.0	38.6	10,669	-0.5%
Labour	4	2	0	+2	28.6	23.9	6,617	+5.3%
Health Concern	1	0	3	-3	7.1	21.1	5,825	-3.7%
Liberal	1	0	0	0	7.1	5.9	1,634	-1.0%
Independent	1	0	0	0	7.1	3.7	1,012	+3.7%
Liberal Democrats	0	0	0	0	0	3.3	909	-6.7%
UKIP	0	0	0	0	0	1.9	512	+1.9%
Green	0	0	0	0	0	1.7	462	+0.1%

== Ward results ==
Aggborough and Spennells
Party	Candidate	Votes	%	±%
Independent	Peter Dyke	831	37.6	+37.6
Conservative	Gill Onslow	570	25.8	−12.3
Labour	Dan Watson	239	10.8	−0.1
Health Concern	Liz Davies	220	9.9	−6.8
Liberal Democrats	Michael Troth	203	9.2	−25.1
UKIP	Tony Baker	149	6.7	+6.7
Majority		261	11.8	
Turnout		2,212	42.7	−25.3
Independent hold		Swing		

Areley Kings
Party	Candidate	Votes	%	±%
Labour	Vi Higgs	691	34.8	+9.8
Conservative	Ken Henderson	652	32.9	−3.3
Health Concern	John Thomas	588	29.6	−9.2
Liberal Democrats	John Stephen	53	2.7	+2.7
Majority		39	2.0	
Turnout		1,984	42.8	−23.3
Labour gain from Health Concern		Swing		

Bewdley and Arley
Party	Candidate	Votes	%	±%
Conservative	Jenny Greener	1,047	42.0	+2.1
Labour	Paul Gittins	681	27.3	+13.2
Health Concern	Derek Killingworth	626	25.1	−2.4
Liberal Democrats	Jayne Smith	141	5.7	−12.7
Majority		366	14.7	+2.3
Turnout		2,495	46.6	−26.3
Conservative hold		Swing		

Blakedown and Chaddesley
Party	Candidate	Votes	%	±%
Conservative	Stephen Williams	1,247	78.6	+11.2
Labour	Matthew Nicholls	198	12.5	+2.8
Liberal Democrats	Jean Prosser	142	8.9	+8.9
Majority		1,049	66.1	+21.6
Turnout		1,587	48.9	−27.6
Conservative hold		Swing		

Broadwaters
Party	Candidate	Votes	%	±%
Labour	Adrian Sewell	602	28.7	+6.4
Health Concern	Mary Rayner	558	26.6	−11.8
Conservative	Juliet Smith	521	24.9	−7.8
Independent	Steven Walker	181	8.6	+8.6
Liberal	Mark Haynes	144	6.9	+6.9
Green	Phil Oliver	89	4.2	−2.4
Majority		44	2.1	
Turnout		2,095	35.3	−23.7
Labour gain from Health Concern		Swing		

Cookley
Party	Candidate	Votes	%	±%
Labour	Christopher Nicholls	538	55.5	+8.6
Conservative	Greta Smith	235	24.2	+0.8
Health Concern	Les Rising	197	20.3	+6.9
Majority		303	31.2	+7.7
Turnout		970	47.4	−1.0
Labour hold		Swing		

Franche
Party	Candidate	Votes	%	±%
Conservative	Anne Hingley	1,098	47.0	+10.3
Labour	Nigel Knowles	714	30.5	+5.3
Health Concern	Michael Shellie	460	19.7	−3.9
Liberal Democrats	Steven Burns	66	2.8	−9.1
Majority		384	16.4	+4.9
Turnout		2,338	42.7	−26.1
Conservative hold		Swing		

Greenhill
Party	Candidate	Votes	%	±%
Conservative	Paul Harrison	701	32.8	+1.4
Liberal	John Stevenson	513	24.0	−17.7
Labour	Vicky Smith	484	22.7	+2.4
Health Concern	Chris Thomas	333	15.6	+15.6
Green	Alexandra Heelis	103	4.8	−1.8
Majority		188	8.8	
Turnout		2,134	35.0	−26.8
Conservative hold		Swing		

Habberley and Blakebrook
Party	Candidate	Votes	%	±%
Labour	Michael Kelly	895	37.9	+13.6
Conservative	Susan Meekings	845	35.8	−1.0
Health Concern	Jim Lawson	485	20.5	−3.0
Liberal Democrats	Clare Cassidy	87	3.7	−9.5
Green	Dave Finch	50	2.1	−0.1
Majority		50	2.1	
Turnout		2,362	45.3	−21.5
Labour hold		Swing		

Lickhill
Party	Candidate	Votes	%	±%
Health Concern	Jim Parish	925	44.0	+2.0
Conservative	David Little	813	38.7	−0.6
Labour	Jennifer Knowles	363	17.3	−1.4
Majority		112	5.3	+2.6
Turnout		2,101	39.0	−27.2
Health Concern hold		Swing		

Mitton
Party	Candidate	Votes	%	±%
Conservative	Chris Rogers	805	36.1	−9.9
Health Concern	Cliff Brewer	778	34.9	−0.9
Labour	Gary Watson	399	17.9	−0.4
UKIP	Bill Jones	156	7.0	+7.0
Green	Steve Brown	89	4.0	+4.0
Majority		27	1.2	−9.0
Turnout		2,227	38.4	−29.0
Conservative gain from Health Concern		Swing		

Offmore and Comberton
Party	Candidate	Votes	%	±%
Liberal	Michael Price	977	43.8	−1.4
Conservative	Averil Chinn	794	35.6	+6.9
Labour	Lee Wright	461	20.7	+7.3
Majority		183	8.2	−8.3
Turnout		2,232	41.6	−26.7
Liberal hold		Swing		

Sutton Park
Party	Candidate	Votes	%	±%
Conservative	Tracey Onslow	822	40.2	−2.0
Health Concern	Linda Candlin	388	19.0	+1.0
Labour	Bill Bradley	352	17.2	−0.9
Liberal Democrats	Adrian Beavis	217	10.6	−7.7
UKIP	Michael Wrench	207	10.1	+10.1
Green	Mike Whitbread	61	3.0	−0.4
Majority		434	21.2	−2.7
Turnout		2,047	36.2	−23.3
Conservative hold		Swing		

Wolverley
Party	Candidate	Votes	%	±%
Conservative	John Hart	519	60.6	+5.0
Health Concern	Caroline Shellie	267	31.2	−2.9
Green	Kate Spohrer	70	8.2	+2.2
Majority		252	29.4	+7.9
Turnout		856	50.4	−1.9
Conservative hold		Swing		
