= 2004 Wyre Forest District Council election =

Election in Worcestershire, England

Map of the results of the 2004 Wyre Forest District Council election. Conservatives in blue, Health Concern in pink, Liberal in orange, Labour in red, Liberal Democrats in yellow and independent in grey.

The 2004 Wyre Forest District Council election took place on 10 June 2004 to elect members of Wyre Forest District Council in Worcestershire, England. The whole council was up for election with boundary changes since the last election in 2003. The council stayed under no overall control, but with the Conservatives taking over as the largest party on the council from the Health Concern party.

== Background ==
In total 113 candidates stood in the election with all 42 seats being contested for the first time since 1979 after boundary changes had taken place. The boundary changes meant that Bewdley ward had gained an extra councillor and become Bewdley and Arley, while Blakedown and Chaddesley had been combined into one ward. The Conservatives put up a full slate of 42 candidates with Health Concern having the next most with 27. Other candidates included 24 Labour, 9 Liberal, 7 Liberal Democrats and 3 independents. A noted feature of the candidates was that there were ten married couples standing in the election with two of them being existing councillors.

Before the election Health Concern had 16 seats on the council as compared to 11 for the Conservatives. This was a drop for Health Concern from 2003 after 3 councillors had defected to the Conservatives.

== Election result ==
The results had the Conservatives gain 8 seats to become the largest party on the council. This was mainly at the expense of Health Concern whose losses included the leader of the council, Howard Martin. For other parties the election saw the Liberals gain one seat to hold 8, while both Labour and the Liberal Democrats stayed on the same number of seats. The results meant that 14 councillors, a third of the council, would be new. Voter turnout was up at 38.83% after seeing less than 31% in 2003, with the highest turnout being 54.36% in Wolverley.

The Conservatives success was put down to a strong campaign and they were expected to form the next administration. This would be the first time in 15 years that the Conservatives would have control of Wyre Forest council, with the other parties saying they would not attempt to form a rival coalition leaving the way clear for the Conservatives. The Conservatives were expected to attempt to implement their manifesto pledges including bringing a cinema to Kidderminster, changing car parking in Kidderminster and reviewing the fortnightly refuse collection.

Conservative control was confirmed at a council meeting on 30 June with Stephen Clee becoming leader of the council. Meanwhile, Health Concern councillors chose Ken Stokes to become the new leader of their group on the council.

Wyre Forest local election result 2004
Party	Seats	Gains	Losses	Net gain/loss	Seats %	Votes %	Votes	+/−
Conservative	19			+8	45.2	38.6	26,373	+11.5
Health Concern	8			-8	19.0	25.8	17,650	-1.2
Liberal	8			+1	19.0	11.7	8,034	-1.0
Labour	4			0	9.5	16.1	11,014	-8.0
Liberal Democrats	2			0	4.8	5.8	3,945	-3.0
Independent	1			-1	2.4	2.0	1,381	+1.6

== Ward results ==
Aggborough and Spennells (3 seats)
Party	Candidate	Votes	%	±%
Liberal Democrats	Helen Dyke	1,037		
Liberal Democrats	Peter Dyke	946		
Conservative	Maureen Aston	673		
Liberal Democrats	Samantha Walker	654		
Health Concern	Keith Robertson	560		
Conservative	Ian Siddall	511		
Health Concern	Anthony Butcher	482		
Conservative	Susan Godwin	479		
Labour	Lesley Brown	182		
Turnout		5,524	38.8	

Areley Kings (3 seats)
Party	Candidate	Votes	%	±%
Conservative	Maureen Mason	841		
Labour	James Shaw	733		
Conservative	Michael Partridge	673		
Conservative	Allan Wood	669		
Labour	James Cooper	628		
Health Concern	Nigel Thomas	606		
Labour	Albert Adams	595		
Independent	Arthur Millington	260		
Turnout		5,005	40.7	

Bewdley and Arley (3 seats)
Party	Candidate	Votes	%	±%
Conservative	Louise Edginton	977		
Health Concern	Mavis Baillie	918		
Conservative	Stephen Clee	906		
Health Concern	Frank Baillie	886		
Health Concern	Maxwell Keen	859		
Conservative	Robert Court	765		
Labour	Paul Gittins	604		
Turnout		5,915	43.6	

Blakedown and Chaddesley (2 seats)
Party	Candidate	Votes	%	±%
Conservative	Stephen Williams	925		
Conservative	Pauline Hayward	867		
Health Concern	Harry Grove	687		
Labour	Flora Wright	166		
Turnout		2,645	47.0	

Broadwaters (3 seats)
Party	Candidate	Votes	%	±%
Liberal	Robert Wheway	770		
Health Concern	Kenneth Stokes	723		
Liberal	Amanda Poole	589		
Health Concern	Marian Spragg	564		
Liberal	Michael Price	526		
Conservative	Gordon Hinton	412		
Labour	Stephen Hill	362		
Conservative	Janette Adams	345		
Conservative	Peter Dudley	322		
Turnout		4,613	32.1	

Cookley
Party	Candidate	Votes	%	±%
Labour	Christopher Nicholls	435	46.7	
Conservative	David Pittaway	296	31.8	
Health Concern	Graham Barker	201	21.6	
Majority		139	14.9	
Turnout		932	50.4	

Franche (3 seats)
Party	Candidate	Votes	%	±%
Conservative	Jeffrey Baker	774		
Conservative	Anne Hingley	738		
Health Concern	Michael Shellie	699		
Health Concern	Howard Martin	693		
Conservative	Graeme Carruthers	646		
Health Concern	Robert Spragg	628		
Labour	Nigel Knowles	625		
Labour	Geoffrey Morgan	561		
Labour	Leroy Wright	490		
Turnout		5,854	38.1	

Greenhill (3 seats)
Party	Candidate	Votes	%	±%
Liberal	Graham Ballinger	1,045		
Liberal	Paul Harrison	993		
Liberal	Rachel Lewis	864		
Health Concern	Christopher Gadd	518		
Health Concern	Pauline Stokes	456		
Conservative	John Aston	324		
Conservative	Geoffrey Bulmer	324		
Conservative	David Muston	306		
Independent	Tavis Pitt	265		
Turnout		5,095	33.9	

Habberley and Blakebrook (3 seats)
Party	Candidate	Votes	%	±%
Labour	Lynn Hyde	931		
Labour	Michael Kelly	825		
Conservative	Arthur Buckley	804		
Labour	Trevor Bennett	771		
Health Concern	Elizabeth Davies	766		
Conservative	Kenneth Prosser	735		
Health Concern	George Eeles	705		
Conservative	Keith Fletcher	670		
Turnout		6,207	44.1	

Lickhill (3 seats)
Party	Candidate	Votes	%	±%
Health Concern	Brian Glass	939		
Health Concern	Jill Fairbrother-Millis	896		
Health Concern	Irene Dolan	768		
Conservative	David Little	696		
Conservative	Ian Cresswell	592		
Conservative	Michael Freeman	553		
Labour	Donovan Giles	344		
Labour	Roger Green	315		
Turnout		5,103	34.3	

Mitton (3 seats)
Party	Candidate	Votes	%	±%
Conservative	John Holden	758		
Conservative	June Salter	748		
Health Concern	Patricia Rimell	736		
Conservative	Michael Salter	691		
Health Concern	Dixon Sheppard	671		
Liberal Democrats	Peter Barrass	505		
Labour	David Keogh-Smith	314		
Labour	Gary Watson	284		
Turnout		4,707	35.1	

Offmore and Comberton (3 seats)
Party	Candidate	Votes	%	±%
Liberal	Frances Oborski	1,186		
Liberal	Michael Oborski	1,043		
Liberal	Siriol Hayward	1,018		
Conservative	Margaret Gregory	561		
Conservative	Sheila Harrold	540		
Conservative	Gillian Onslow	539		
Labour	Keith Budden	415		
Turnout		5,302	40.4	

Oldington and Foley Park (2 seats)
Party	Candidate	Votes	%	±%
Conservative	Nathan Desmond	493		
Conservative	Susan Meekings	414		
Health Concern	Peter Young	373		
Labour	James Brown	299		
Labour	John Gretton	291		
Liberal Democrats	Clive Parsons	195		
Turnout		2,065	31.6	

Rock
Party	Candidate	Votes	%	±%
Independent	John Simmonds	488	53.7	
Conservative	Douglas Godwin	420	46.3	
Majority		68	7.4	
Turnout		908	46.2	

Sutton Park (3 seats)
Party	Candidate	Votes	%	±%
Conservative	Marcus Hart	1,001		
Conservative	James Dudley	931		
Conservative	John-Paul Campion	852		
Health Concern	Jennifer Harrison	619		
Health Concern	Anthony Greenfield	606		
Liberal Democrats	Martin Meredith	375		
Labour	William Bradley	301		
Liberal Democrats	Stanley Ratcliff	233		
Turnout		4,918	35.2	

Wolverley
Party	Candidate	Votes	%	±%
Conservative	Malcolm Hazlewood	439	46.4	
Independent	Nigel Addison	368	38.9	
Labour	Conrad Bourne	139	14.7	
Majority		71	7.5	
Turnout		946	54.4	

Wribbenhall (2 seats)
Party	Candidate	Votes	%	±%
Conservative	William Jones	621		
Health Concern	Anthony Williams	574		
Conservative	Gordon Yarranton	542		
Health Concern	Derek Killingworth	517		
Labour	Barry McFarland	404		
Turnout		2,658	39.0	

== By-elections between 2004 and 2006 ==
A by-election was held in Aggborough and Spennells after the death of Conservative councillor Maureen Aston. Candidates at the election included the former leader of the council Howard Martin for Health Concern, a former councillor for the ward, Adrian Sewell for Labour, and the first Green Party candidate for an election to Wyre Forest District Council, Kate Spohrer. The seat was held by Conservative John Aston, husband of the former councillor, with a majority of 63 votes over Liberal Democrat Samantha Walker.

Aggborough and Spennells by-election 27 October 2005
Party	Candidate	Votes	%	±%
Conservative	John Aston	527	40.0	+15.3
Liberal Democrats	Samantha Walker	464	35.2	−12.8
Health Concern	Howard Martin	185	14.0	−6.6
Labour	Adrian Sewell	108	8.2	+1.5
Green	Katherine Spohrer	33	2.5	+2.5
Majority		63	4.8	
Turnout		1,317	24.7	−14.1
Conservative hold		Swing		
