= 2006 Wyre Forest District Council election =

2006 UK local government election

Map of the results of the 2006 Wyre Forest District Council election. Conservatives in blue, Health Concern in pink and Liberal in orange. Wards in grey were not contested in 2006.

The 2006 Wyre Forest District Council election took place on 4 May 2006 to elect members of Wyre Forest District Council in Worcestershire, England. One third of the council was up for election and the council stayed under no overall control.

After the election, the composition of the council was:

- Conservative 18
- Health Concern 9
- Liberal 7
- Labour 4
- Liberal Democrats 2
- Independent 2

== Campaign ==
Before the 2006 election the Conservatives had 18 seats on the council, both Health Concern and the Liberals had 8 seats, Labour had 4 seats and both the Liberal Democrats and independents had 2 seats. Since the last election in 2004 one Conservative councillor, Louise Edginton, had left the party to become an independent, after not being selected as a candidate for the 2005 Worcestershire County Council election.

14 seats were contested in the election with the Conservatives defending 7, Health Concern 4 and the Liberals 3. 50 candidates, including the leader of the council Stephen Clee, stood in the election with the Conservatives hoping to take overall control.

Local health services continued to be the major issue in the campaign after the local NHS trust announced in April 2006 that it would have to cut 720 jobs in order to save money. Other issues in the election included council tax, with the Conservatives saying they had reduced its burden since they began running the council in 2004, and a lack of affordable housing which Labour wanted to address.

== Election result ==
There was a net change of only one seat with Health Concern moving to 9 seats at the expense of the Liberals. Health Concern's gain from the Liberals came in Broadwaters ward where the sitting Liberal councillor, Amanda Poole, stood down at the election. Health Concern saw the election results as being excellent, with the health issue in the lead up to the election seen as having helped the party.

As a result, the Conservatives failed to take the majority they had been aiming for with the Conservative leader of the council, Stephen Clee, disappointed at failing to make gains but pleased that they remained the largest party. The Labour leader on the council, Jamie Shaw, described the results as "very bad indeed" after the party failed to win any seats. Overall voter turnout at the election was 37.5%.

Wyre Forest local election result 2006
Party	Seats	Gains	Losses	Net gain/loss	Seats %	Votes %	Votes	+/−
Conservative	7	2	2	0	50.0	39.5	10,229	+0.9%
Health Concern	5	3	2	+1	35.7	32.3	8,362	+6.5%
Liberal	2	0	1	-1	14.3	8.8	2,267	-2.9%
Labour	0	0	0	0	0	15.9	4,124	-0.2%
Liberal Democrats	0	0	0	0	0	3.1	815	-2.7%
Independent	0	0	0	0	0	0.2	60	-1.8%
Green	0	0	0	0	0	0.2	42	+0.2%

== Ward results ==
Aggborough and Spennells
Party	Candidate	Votes	%	±%
Conservative	John Aston	858	46.5	
Liberal Democrats	Samantha Walker	440	23.9	
Health Concern	John Griffiths	387	21.0	
Labour	Adrian Sewell	117	6.3	
Green	Katherine Spohrer	42	2.3	
Majority		418	22.6	
Turnout		1,844	35.7	−3.1
Conservative hold		Swing		

Areley Kings
Party	Candidate	Votes	%	±%
Health Concern	Nigel Thomas	667	38.8	
Conservative	Michael Partridge	657	38.2	
Labour	Cedric Smith	396	23.0	
Majority		10	0.6	
Turnout		1,720	37.5	−3.2
Health Concern gain from Conservative		Swing		

Bewdley and Arley
Party	Candidate	Votes	%	±%
Conservative	Stephen Clee	1,018	45.7	
Health Concern	Elizabeth Davies	732	32.9	
Labour	Paul Gittins	476	21.4	
Majority		286	12.8	
Turnout		2,226	42.2	−1.4
Conservative hold		Swing		

Blakedown and Chaddesley
Party	Candidate	Votes	%	±%
Conservative	Pauline Hayward	1,036	66.4	
Health Concern	Anthony Williams	376	24.1	
Labour	James Brown	148	9.5	
Majority		660	42.3	
Turnout		1,560	47.8	+0.8
Conservative hold		Swing		

Broadwaters
Party	Candidate	Votes	%	±%
Health Concern	Howard Martin	601	32.6	
Conservative	Mumshad Ahmed	506	27.5	
Liberal	Timothy Ingram	475	25.8	
Labour	Stephen Hill	261	14.2	
Majority		95	5.1	
Turnout		1,843	32.5	+0.4
Health Concern gain from Liberal		Swing		

Franche
Party	Candidate	Votes	%	±%
Health Concern	Michael Shellie	861	39.1	
Conservative	Gordon Hinton	751	34.1	
Labour	Nigel Knowles	590	26.8	
Majority		110	5.0	
Turnout		2,202	41.2	+3.1
Health Concern hold		Swing		

Greenhill
Party	Candidate	Votes	%	±%
Liberal	Rachel Lewis	935	49.9	
Health Concern	Margaret Bradley	430	22.9	
Conservative	Geoffrey Bulmer	289	15.4	
Labour	Dean Cox	160	8.5	
Independent	Tavis Pitt	60	3.2	
Majority		505	27.0	
Turnout		1,874	32.2	−1.7
Liberal hold		Swing		

Habberley and Blakebrook
Party	Candidate	Votes	%	±%
Health Concern	George Eeles	834	38.9	
Conservative	Arthur Buckley	765	35.7	
Labour	David Prain	543	25.4	
Majority		69	3.2	
Turnout		2,142	41.8	−2.3
Health Concern gain from Conservative		Swing		

Lickhill
Party	Candidate	Votes	%	±%
Health Concern	Dixon Sheppard	1,042	53.7	
Conservative	Christopher Rogers	654	33.7	
Labour	Donovan Giles	245	12.6	
Majority		388	20.0	
Turnout		1,941	35.6	+1.3
Health Concern hold		Swing		

Mitton
Party	Candidate	Votes	%	±%
Conservative	Michael Salter	833	44.0	
Health Concern	Patricia Rimell	822	43.4	
Labour	Gary Watson	238	12.6	
Majority		11	0.6	
Turnout		1,893	34.9	−0.2
Conservative gain from Health Concern		Swing		

Offmore and Comberton
Party	Candidate	Votes	%	±%
Liberal	Siriol Hayward	857	37.9	
Conservative	Tracey Onslow	773	34.2	
Health Concern	Keith Robertson	395	17.5	
Labour	Roy Darkes	235	10.4	
Majority		84	3.7	
Turnout		2,260	42.7	+2.3
Liberal hold		Swing		

Oldington and Foley Park
Party	Candidate	Votes	%	±%
Conservative	Susan Meekings	417	38.5	
Health Concern	Caroline Godfrey	249	23.0	
Liberal Democrats	Adrian Beavis	236	21.8	
Labour	Paul Mills	180	16.6	
Majority		168	15.5	
Turnout		1,082	31.1	−0.5
Conservative hold		Swing		

Sutton Park
Party	Candidate	Votes	%	±%
Conservative	John-Paul Campion	912	49.5	
Health Concern	Raymond Barber	540	29.3	
Labour	Leroy Wright	251	13.6	
Liberal Democrats	Clive Parsons	139	7.5	
Majority		372	20.2	
Turnout		1,842	34.5	−0.7
Conservative hold		Swing		

Wribbenhall
Party	Candidate	Votes	%	±%
Conservative	Gordon Yarranton	760	51.7	
Health Concern	Anne Mace	426	29.0	
Labour	Jennifer Knowles	284	19.3	
Majority		334	22.7	
Turnout		1,470	38.5	−0.5
Conservative gain from Health Concern		Swing		
