= 2002 Wyre Forest District Council election =

2002 UK local government election

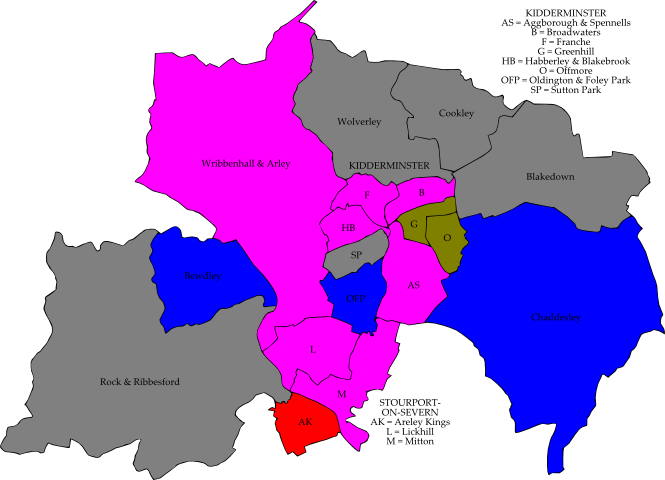
Map of the results of the 2002 Wyre Forest District Council election. Health Concern in pink, Conservatives in blue, Liberal in olive and Labour in red. Wards in grey were not contested in 2002.

The 2002 Wyre Forest District Council election took place on 2 May 2002 to elect members of Wyre Forest District Council in Worcestershire, England. One third of the council was up for election and the Independent Kidderminster Hospital and Health Concern party gained overall control of the council from no overall control.

After the election, the composition of the council was:

- Health Concern 21
- Conservative 6
- Labour 5
- Liberal 5
- Liberal Democrats 2
- Independent 2
- Vacant 1

== Campaign ==
Before the election the council was run by a coalition of Health Concern, Conservative, Liberal Democrats and Liberal councillors. 14 seats were initially expected to be contested with the Conservatives unopposed in Chaddesley ward. However, in mid April the defending Liberal Democrat councillor for Sutton Park, Steve Roberts, died meaning that the election in that ward was postponed until a by-election could be held. With Labour defending 6 of the seats which were being contested there was an expectation that the Health Concern group could gain a majority on the council. Since the last election in 2000, Richard Taylor from Health Concern had gained the parliamentary constituency from Labour in the 2001 general election.

The issue of the downgrading of the local Kidderminster hospital, which had dominated the last two council election, continued to remain a significant theme of the campaign. Another issue which was raised in the campaign was concern over plans to establish a new incinerator in Kidderminster, which was opposed by all the parties contesting the election.

== Election result ==
The results saw the Health Concern party gain control of the council after making a net gain of five seats. This meant that Health Concern had 21 seats, 15 more than any other party. They thus had control of the council on the chairman's casting vote.

The gains for Health Concern were mainly at the expense of Labour who lost five seats, with the Liberal Democrats also losing a seat. However both the Conservative and Liberal parties gained one seat each. Overall turnout at the election was 32%.

Wyre Forest local election result 2002
Party	Seats	Gains	Losses	Net gain/loss	Seats %	Votes %	Votes	+/−
Health Concern	7	6	1	+5	53.8	29.6	5,837	
Conservative	3	1	0	+1	23.1	25.1	4,947	
Liberal	2	1	0	+1	15.4	13.0	2,569	
Labour	1	0	5	-5	7.7	24.8	4,892	
Liberal Democrats	0	0	1	-1	0	6.3	1,233	
Independent	0	0	1	-1	0	1.1	221	

== Ward results ==
Aggborough and Spennells
Party	Candidate	Votes	%	±%
Health Concern	Keith Robertson	781	34.2	
Liberal Democrats	Peter Dyke	712	31.2	
Conservative	Keith Fletcher	560	24.6	
Labour	Mari Jones	154	6.8	
Liberal	Kevin Hill	74	3.2	
Majority		69	3.0	
Turnout		2,281		
Health Concern gain from Liberal Democrats		Swing		

Areley Kings
Party	Candidate	Votes	%	±%
Labour	Albert Adams	694	46.6	
Conservative	Michael Partridge	575	38.6	
Independent	Jim Millington	221	14.8	
Majority		119	8.0	
Turnout		1,490		
Labour hold		Swing		

Bewdley
Party	Candidate	Votes	%	±%
Conservative	Stephen Clee	836	54.7	
Labour	Paul Gittins	692	45.3	
Majority		144	9.4	
Turnout		1,528		
Conservative hold		Swing		

Broadwaters
Party	Candidate	Votes	%	±%
Health Concern	Marion Spragg	591	46.6	
Labour	John Stevens	306	24.1	
Liberal	Rob Wheway	189	14.9	
Conservative	John Friend	120	9.5	
Liberal Democrats	Michael Gay	62	4.9	
Majority		285	22.5	
Turnout		1,268		
Health Concern gain from Labour		Swing		

Chaddesley Corbett
Party	Candidate	Votes	%	±%
Conservative	Stephen Williams	unopposed		
Conservative hold		Swing		

Franche
Party	Candidate	Votes	%	±%
Health Concern	Kimberley Poller	819	48.1	
Labour	Nigel Knowles	549	32.2	
Conservative	Kevin Ruddy	299	17.5	
Liberal Democrats	Nigel Goodman	37	2.2	
Majority		270	15.9	
Turnout		1,704		
Health Concern gain from Labour		Swing		

Greenhill
Party	Candidate	Votes	%	±%
Liberal	Paul Harrison	960	57.2	
Health Concern	Mike Shellie	364	21.7	
Labour	John Gretton	224	13.3	
Conservative	Geoff Bulmer	131	7.8	
Majority		596	35.5	
Turnout		1,679		
Liberal gain from Health Concern		Swing		

Habberley and Blakebrook
Party	Candidate	Votes	%	±%
Health Concern	Howard Eeles	1,036	53.1	
Labour	Lynn Hyde	656	33.6	
Conservative	Neil Anderson	220	11.3	
Liberal Democrats	Mike Price	40	2.0	
Majority		380	19.5	
Turnout		1,952		
Health Concern gain from Labour		Swing		

Lickhill
Party	Candidate	Votes	%	±%
Health Concern	Jill Fairbrother-Millis	920	53.2	
Conservative	Gary Talbot	463	26.8	
Labour	Graham Whitefoot	346	20.0	
Majority		457	26.4	
Turnout		1,729		
Health Concern hold		Swing		

Mitton
Party	Candidate	Votes	%	±%
Health Concern	Maureen Aston	665	44.5	
Conservative	David Little	473	31.7	
Labour	Mick Grinnall	356	23.8	
Majority		192	12.8	
Turnout		1,494		
Health Concern gain from Labour		Swing		

Offmore
Party	Candidate	Votes	%	±%
Liberal	Mike Oborski	1,346	74.2	
Labour	Adrian Sewell	240	13.2	
Conservative	Margaret Gregory	229	12.6	
Majority		1,106	61.0	
Turnout		1,815		
Liberal hold		Swing		

Oldington and Foley Park
Party	Candidate	Votes	%	±%
Conservative	Nathan Desmond	543	43.3	
Liberal Democrats	Clare Cassidy	382	30.5	
Labour	William Bradley	328	26.2	
Majority		161	12.8	
Turnout		1,253		
Conservative gain from Labour		Swing		

Wribbenhall and Arley
Party	Candidate	Votes	%	±%
Health Concern	Tony Greenfield	661	43.9	
Conservative	Louise Edginton	498	33.1	
Labour	Barry McFarland	347	23.0	
Majority		163	10.8	
Turnout		1,506		
Health Concern gain from Independent		Swing		

== By-elections between 2002 and 2003 ==
A by-election was held in Sutton Park on 13 June 2002 after the death of Liberal Democrat councillor Steve Roberts. The seat was gained for the Conservatives by Marcus Hart with a majority of 77 votes over Health Concern candidate Jennifer Harrison. This meant Health Concern no longer had a majority on the council, but continued to run the council with the casting vote of the council chairman, as they had 21 of the 42 seats on the council.

Sutton Park by-election 13 June 2002
Party	Candidate	Votes	%	±%
Conservative	Marcus Hart	583	38.1	+29.7
Health Concern	Jennifer Harrison	506	33.1	−20.9
Liberal Democrats	Clare Cassidy	253	16.5	−12.4
Labour	William Bradley	187	12.2	+3.5
Majority		77	5.0	
Turnout		1,529	31.8	
Conservative gain from Liberal Democrats		Swing		
