= 2012 Wyre Forest District Council election =

2012 UK local government election

Map of the results of the 2012 Wyre Forest District Council election. Health Concern in pink, Conservatives in blue, Labour in red, Liberals in orange and independent in light grey. Wards in dark grey were not contested in 2012.

The 2012 Wyre Forest District Council election took place on 3 May 2012 to elect members of Wyre Forest District Council in Worcestershire, England. One third of the council was up for election and the Conservative Party lost overall control of the council to no overall control.

After the election, the composition of the council was:

- Conservative 20
- Health Concern 8
- Labour 8
- Liberal 4
- Independent 2

== Background ==
After the May 2011 Wyre Forest District Council election the Conservatives had a majority on the council with 24 councillors, compared to 6 for Labour, 5 Liberals, 4 Health Concern and 3 independents. However, later that month one of the Liberal councillors, Graham Ballinger, defected to Health Concern. A further change then came in July 2011, when Mumshad Ahamed, who had sat as an independent councillor since being expelled from the Conservative group in June 2009, joined the Labour Party.

14 of the 42 seats on the council were contested in 2012, with the Conservatives, Labour and Health Concern having candidates for every seat. The Conservatives defended 8 of the 14 seats, with 3 members of the council cabinet, Nathan Desmond, Marcus Hart and Julian Phillips, standing for re-election.

== Election result ==
The Conservatives lost four of the eight seats they were defending and so no longer had a majority on the council as they were left with 20 of the 42 councillors. Health Concern were the main beneficiaries picking up three seats and holding two more to have 8 seats on the council. This pulled them level to Labour who also had 8 councillors after making a gain of one seat, with Labour coming within five votes of taking another seat in Oldington and Foley Park from the Conservatives. Independent Helen Dyke held her seat, while the only Liberal councillor to defend a seat, group leader Fran Oborski, successfully defended it after 39 years on the council.

Wyre Forest local election result 2012
Party	Seats	Gains	Losses	Net gain/loss	Seats %	Votes %	Votes	+/−
Health Concern	5	3	0	+3	35.7	31.2	6,640	+10.1
Conservative	4	0	4	-4	28.6	27.8	5,912	-10.8
Labour	3	2	1	+1	21.4	26.0	5,529	+2.1
Liberal	1	0	0	0	7.1	5.4	1,145	-0.5
Independent	1	0	0	0	7.1	3.9	826	+0.2
UKIP	0	0	0	0	0.0	3.3	692	+1.4
Green	0	0	0	0	0.0	2.3	484	+0.6
Liberal Democrats	0	0	0	0	0.0	0.2	34	-3.1

== Ward results ==
Aggborough and Spennells
Party	Candidate	Votes	%	±%
Independent	Helen Dyke	826	50.0	+12.4
Health Concern	Keith Robertson	323	19.5	+9.6
Conservative	Madeline Craddock	270	16.3	−9.5
Labour	Vicky Smith	173	10.5	−0.3
Green	Ronald Lee	61	3.7	+3.7
Majority		503	30.4	+18.6
Turnout		1,653	31.4	−11.3
Independent hold		Swing		

Areley Kings
Party	Candidate	Votes	%	±%
Labour	Jamie Shaw	774	48.4	+13.6
Health Concern	John Thomas	467	29.2	−0.4
Conservative	Ken Henderson	357	22.3	−10.6
Majority		307	19.2	+17.2
Turnout		1,598	33.7	−9.1
Labour hold		Swing		

Bewdley and Arley
Party	Candidate	Votes	%	±%
Conservative	Julian Phillips	772	41.1	−0.9
Health Concern	Linda Candlin	657	35.0	+9.9
Labour	Robert Ireland	448	23.9	−3.4
Majority		115	6.1	−8.6
Turnout		1,877	34.9	−11.7
Conservative hold		Swing		

Broadwaters
Party	Candidate	Votes	%	±%
Health Concern	Mary Rayner	619	37.8	+11.2
Labour	Mumshad Ahmed	581	35.5	+6.8
Conservative	Juliet Smith	277	16.9	−8.0
Liberal	Esther Smart	81	4.9	−2.0
Green	Louise Ryan	80	4.9	+0.7
Majority		38	2.3	
Turnout		1,638	27.5	−7.8
Health Concern gain from Labour		Swing		

Franche
Party	Candidate	Votes	%	±%
Labour	Nigel Knowles	592	34.2	+3.7
Health Concern	Caroline Shellie	441	25.5	+5.8
Conservative	Nick Farress	435	25.2	−21.8
UKIP	Tony Baker	191	11.0	+11.0
Green	Phillip Oliver	36	2.1	+2.1
Liberal Democrats	Michael Troth	34	2.0	−0.8
Majority		151	8.7	
Turnout		1,729	31.2	−11.5
Labour gain from Conservative		Swing		

Greenhill
Party	Candidate	Votes	%	±%
Health Concern	Graham Ballinger	511	32.1	+16.5
Labour	Steven Walker	426	26.8	+4.1
Liberal	Rachel Lewis	296	18.6	−5.4
Conservative	Sue Meekings	273	17.2	−15.6
Green	Alexandra Heelis	85	5.3	+0.5
Majority		85	5.3	
Turnout		1,591	25.5	−9.5
Health Concern hold		Swing		

Habberley and Blakebrook
Party	Candidate	Votes	%	±%
Labour	Barry McFarland	656	36.4	−1.5
Conservative	Ken Prosser	524	29.1	−6.7
Health Concern	Anthony Greenfield	404	22.4	+1.9
UKIP	Neil Jukes	178	9.9	+9.9
Green	Dave Finch	38	2.1	+0.0
Majority		132	7.3	+5.2
Turnout		1,800	34.6	−10.7
Labour gain from Conservative		Swing		

Lickhill
Party	Candidate	Votes	%	±%
Health Concern	Brian Glass	841	52.9	+8.9
Conservative	Dave Little	446	28.1	−10.7
Labour	Rob Lloyd	303	19.1	+1.8
Majority		395	24.8	+19.5
Turnout		1,590	29.0	−10.0
Health Concern hold		Swing		

Mitton
Party	Candidate	Votes	%	±%
Health Concern	Cliff Brewer	713	42.7	+7.8
Conservative	John Holden	567	34.0	−2.1
Labour	Gary Watson	278	16.7	−1.2
Green	Stephen Brown	110	6.6	+2.6
Majority		146	8.8	
Turnout		1,668	28.0	−10.4
Health Concern gain from Conservative		Swing		

Offmore and Comberton
Party	Candidate	Votes	%	±%
Liberal	Frances Oborski	768	43.6	−0.2
Health Concern	John Stevenson	444	25.2	+25.2
Conservative	Greta Smith	282	16.0	−19.6
Labour	Lee Wright	266	15.1	−5.6
Majority		324	18.4	+10.2
Turnout		1,760	32.4	−9.2
Liberal hold		Swing		

Oldington and Foley Park
Party	Candidate	Votes	%	±%
Conservative	Nathan Desmond	261	30.5	−2.9
Labour	Sam Arnold	256	29.9	+6.2
Health Concern	Nicky Martin	190	22.2	+0.9
UKIP	Heather Lacy	127	14.9	+14.9
Green	Angela Hartwich	21	2.5	+2.5
Majority		5	0.6	−9.1
Turnout		855	22.6	−24.9
Conservative hold		Swing		

Rock
Party	Candidate	Votes	%	±%
Conservative	Douglas Godwin	402	58.1	−4.2
Health Concern	Jim Lawson	222	32.1	+32.1
Labour	Gren Jones	68	9.8	+9.8
Majority		180	26.0	+1.4
Turnout		692	34.0	−14.0
Conservative hold		Swing		

Sutton Park
Party	Candidate	Votes	%	±%
Conservative	Marcus Hart	636	41.7	+1.5
Health Concern	Chris Thomas	332	21.8	+2.8
Labour	Lynn Hyde	307	20.1	+2.9
UKIP	Michael Wrench	196	12.9	+2.8
Green	Mike Whitbread	53	3.5	+0.5
Majority		304	19.9	−1.3
Turnout		1,524	26.7	−9.5
Conservative hold		Swing		

Wribbenhall
Party	Candidate	Votes	%	±%
Health Concern	Liz Davies	476	37.0	+12.0
Conservative	Andy Tromans	410	31.9	−12.7
Labour	Paul Gittens	401	31.2	+13.7
Majority		66	5.1	
Turnout		1,287	31.9	−39.3
Health Concern gain from Conservative		Swing		
