= 2017 Shropshire Council election =

2017 UK local government election

← 2013	4 May 2017	2021 →

All 74 seats to Shropshire Council 38 seats needed for a majority
	First party	Second party	Third party
Party	Conservative	Liberal Democrats	Labour
Seats won	49	12	8
Seat change	▲1	Steady	▼1
- Map showing the results of the 2017 elections. Striped divisions have mixed representation.
Council control before election
Conservative
Council control after election
Conservative

The 2017 Shropshire Council election took place on 4 May 2017 as part of the 2017 local elections in the United Kingdom. All 74 councillors were elected from 63 electoral divisions which return either one, two or three councillors each by first-past-the-post voting for a four-year term of office.

== Results ==
=== Summary ===
Shropshire Council election, 2017
Party	Seats	Gains	Losses	Net gain/loss	Seats %	Votes %	Votes	+/−
Conservative	49	3	2	+1		48.78	51,215	
Liberal Democrats	12			-		20.08	21,078	
Labour	8			-1		16.27	17,083	
Green	1	1	0	+1		7.48	7,850	
Independent	3			-1		5.17	5,426	
Health Concern	1					1.25	1,311	
UKIP	0				0.0	0.95	994	
Federalist Party of the United Kingdom						0.08	79	
Total							104,986	

All wards are single seat unless otherwise stated

The results below are sourced from the Shropshire Council website.

=== Abbey ===
Abbey
Party	Candidate	Votes	%	±%
Liberal Democrats	Hannah Fraser	790	55.59	
Conservative	Georgina Alison Boulger	345	24.28	
Labour	Mark James Healey	223	15.69	
UKIP	John Kinsey Price	63	4.43	
Majority				
Turnout		1421		
Liberal Democrats hold		Swing		

=== Albrighton ===
Albrighton
Party	Candidate	Votes	%	±%
Conservative	Malcolm Pate	882	75.27	
Independent	Phillip Michael Harrison	419	32.21	
Majority				
Turnout		1301		
Conservative hold		Swing		

=== Alveley and Claverley ===
Alveley and Claverley
Party	Candidate	Votes	%	±%
Conservative	Tina Woodward	919	75.27	
Liberal Democrats	Colin Taylor	302	24.73	
Majority				
Turnout		1221		
Conservative hold		Swing		

=== Bagley ===
Bagley
Party	Candidate	Votes	%	±%
Conservative	Alexander George Phillips	511	39.95	
Liberal Democrats	Beverley Baker	385	30.1	
Labour	Wynn Davies	383	29.95	
Majority				
Turnout		1279		
Conservative hold		Swing		

=== Battlefield ===
Battlefield
Party	Candidate	Votes	%	±%
Conservative	Dean Spencer Carroll	476	57.28	
Labour	Gianluca Cerritelli	285	34.3	
Green	Chris Davenport	70	8.42	
Majority				
Turnout		831		
Conservative hold		Swing		

=== Bayston Hill, Column and Sutton ===
Bayston Hill, Column and Sutton (3 seats)
Party	Candidate	Votes	%	±%
Labour	Ted Clarke	2,318	55.63	
Labour	Tony Parsons	1,820	43.68	
Labour	Jane Mackenzie	1,720	41.28	
Conservative	Janine Hayter	1315	31.56	
Conservative	Andrea Caroline Hall	1206	28.94	
Conservative	Ryan Peter Alan Harrison	1114	26.73	
Liberal Democrats	Will Coles	474	11.38	
Green	Chris Lemon	318	7.63	
UKIP	Ray Graham	296	7.10	
Green	Josh Cockburn	276	6.62	
Majority				
Majority				
Majority				
Turnout		4174		
Labour hold		Swing		
Labour hold		Swing		
Labour hold		Swing		

=== Belle Vue ===
Belle Vue
Party	Candidate	Votes	%	±%
Labour	Harry Taylor	643	43.01	
Liberal Democrats	Daniel Adam Clark	423	28.29	
Conservative	Simon James Wray	362	24.21	
Green	Dave Latham	67	4.48	
Majority				
Turnout		1495		
Labour hold		Swing		

=== Bishop's Castle ===
Bishop's Castle
Party	Candidate	Votes	%	±%
Liberal Democrats	Jonathan Keeley	960	73.62	
Conservative	Christopher John Tyler	273	20.94	
Majority				
Turnout		1304		
Liberal Democrats hold		Swing		

=== Bowbrook ===
Bowbrook
Party	Candidate	Votes	%	±%
Conservative	Peter Adams	688	68.66	
Liberal Democrats	David Arwyn Ellams	161	16.07	
Green	Peter John Gilbert	153	15.27	
Majority				
Turnout		1002		
Conservative hold		Swing		

=== Bridgnorth East and Astley Abbotts ===
Bridgnorth East and Astley Abbotts (2 seats)
Party	Candidate	Votes	%	±%
Conservative	Christian Lea	1,079	55.65	
Conservative	William Parr	930	47.96	
Labour	Julia Buckley	551	28.42	
Liberal Democrats	Naomi Vanessa Voysey	440	22.69	
Liberal Democrats	Richard Antony Fox	418	21.56	
Majority				
Majority				
Turnout		1950		
Conservative hold		Swing		
Conservative hold		Swing		

=== Bridgnorth West and Tasley ===
Bridgnorth West and Tasley (2 seats)
Party	Candidate	Votes	%	±%
Conservative	Les Winwood	1,098	58.78	
Conservative	Elliott Liam Lynch	873	46.73	
Liberal Democrats	David Norman Cooper	511	27.36	
Liberal Democrats	Stephen Golding Barras	458	24.52	
Labour	Mick Lane	312	16.70	
UKIP	Rod Evans	135	7.23	
Majority				
Majority				
Turnout		1876		
Conservative hold		Swing		
Conservative hold		Swing		

=== Broseley ===
Broseley
Party	Candidate	Votes	%	±%
Conservative	Simon Christopher Harris	892	60.6	
Labour	Gavin Nocholas Goodall	580	39.4	
Majority				
Turnout		1472		
Conservative gain from Labour		Swing		

=== Brown Clee ===
Brown Clee
Party	Candidate	Votes	%	±%
Conservative	Robert Tindall	887	79.77	
Liberal Democrats	Frederick David Voysey	225	20.23	
Majority				
Turnout		1112		
Conservative hold		Swing		

=== Burnell ===
Burnell
Party	Candidate	Votes	%	±%
Conservative	Dan Morris	847	49.1	
Liberal Democrats	Kate King	814	47.19	
Green	Tereza Hayek	64	3.71	
Majority				
Turnout		1725		
Conservative hold		Swing		

=== Castlefields and Ditherington ===
Castlefields and Ditherington
Party	Candidate	Votes	%	±%
Labour	Alan Mosley	857	74.2	
Conservative	Robert Charles Osborne	180	15.58	
UKIP	Sylvia Loosley	60	5.19	
Green	Claire Judith	58	5.02	
Majority				
Turnout		1155		
Labour hold		Swing		

=== Cheswardine ===
Cheswardine
Party	Candidate	Votes	%	±%
Conservative	Rob Gittins	735	76.01	
Labour	Len Surridge	232	23.99	
Majority				
Turnout		967		
Conservative hold		Swing		

=== Chirbury and Worthen ===
Chirbury and Worthen
Party	Candidate	Votes	%	±%
Liberal Democrats	Heather Kidd	1003	77.75	
Conservative	Phillip Dennis Morgan	287	22.25	
Majority				
Turnout		1290		
Liberal Democrats hold		Swing		

=== Church Stretton and Craven Arms ===
Church Stretton and Craven Arms (2 seats)
Party	Candidate	Votes	%	±%
Conservative	Lee Chapman	1,579	52.58	
Conservative	David Evans	1,536	51.15	
Liberal Democrats	Sam Jones	815	27.14	
Liberal Democrats	Steve Jones	711	23.68	
Green	Steve Hale	404	13.45	
Green	Hilary Raborg Houchin Wendt	388	12.92	
Majority				
Majority				
Turnout		3021		
Conservative hold		Swing		
Conservative hold		Swing		

=== Clee ===
Clee
Party	Candidate	Votes	%	±%
Liberal Democrats	Richard Huffer	899	60.99	
Conservative	James Wheeler	575	39.01	
Majority				
Turnout		1474		
Liberal Democrats hold		Swing		

=== Cleobury Mortimer ===
Cleobury Mortimer (2 seats)
Party	Candidate	Votes	%	±%
Conservative	Gwilym Butler	1,349	64.98	
Health Concern	Madge Shineton	1,311	63.15	
Labour	John Mayers Rodgers	315	15.17	
Liberal Democrats	Lucinda Faye Timmins	255	12.28	
Liberal Democrats	Brett Lewis Jenkins	191	9.20	
Majority				
Majority				
Turnout		2084		
Conservative hold		Swing		
Health Concern hold		Swing		

=== Clun ===
Clun
Party	Candidate	Votes	%	±%
Liberal Democrats	Nigel Hartin	911	55.86	
Conservative	Sarah Jane Smith	720	44.14	
Majority				
Turnout		1631		
Liberal Democrats hold		Swing		

=== Copthorne ===
Copthorne
Party	Candidate	Votes	%	±%
Conservative	Peter Nutting	735	59.85	
Liberal Democrats	Rob Lea	287	23.37	
Green	Gareth Stephen Egarr	151	12.3	
UKIP	Frank James Henry Burgess	55	4.48	
Majority				
Turnout		1228		
Conservative hold		Swing		

=== Corvedale ===
Corvedale
Party	Candidate	Votes	%	±%
Conservative	Cecilia Motley	1058	80.4	
Labour	Manda Scott	258	19.6	
Majority				
Turnout		1316		
Conservative hold		Swing		

=== Ellesmere Urban ===
Ellesmere Urban
Party	Candidate	Votes	%	±%
Conservative	Elizabeth Hartley	671	67.44	
Liberal Democrats	Rod Keyes	324	32.56	
Majority				
Turnout		995		
Conservative hold		Swing		

=== Gobowen, Selattyn and Weston Rhyn ===
Gobowen, Selattyn and Weston Rhyn (2 seats)
Party	Candidate	Votes	%	±%
Conservative	Robert Macey	826	49.76	
Conservative	Thomas Mark Jones	748	45.06	
Labour	Craig David Emery	397	23.92	
Green	Paul Herbert	353	21.27	
Labour	Jack Roberts	335	20.18	
Liberal Democrats	Henry John Stevens	279	16.81	
Green	Stephen James Froggatt	146	8.80	
Majority				
Majority				
Turnout		1663		
Conservative hold		Swing		
Conservative hold		Swing		

=== Harlescott ===
Harlescott
Party	Candidate	Votes	%	±%
Labour	Ioan Gruffydd Jones	552	57.14	
Conservative	Martin Richard Croll	324	33.54	
UKIP	Marino Bernardo Pacini	90	9.32	
Majority				
Turnout		966		
Labour hold		Swing		

=== Highley ===
Highley
Party	Candidate	Votes	%	±%
Independent	Dave Tremellen	427	43.13	
Conservative	Edward Gilliams	282	28.48	
Labour	Nicki Barker	170	17.17	
Independent	George Christopher Court	111	11.21	
Majority				
Turnout		990		
Independent hold		Swing		

=== Hodnet ===
Hodnet
Party	Candidate	Votes	%	±%
Conservative	Karen Calder	716	82.02	
Labour	Charles Henry Warren Love	157	17.98	
Majority				
Turnout		873		
Conservative hold		Swing		

=== Llanymynech ===
Llanymynech
Party	Candidate	Votes	%	±%
Conservative	Matt Lee	671	62.07	
Green	Olly Rose	249	23.03	
Liberal Democrats	John Alexander Thornton	161	14.89	
Majority				
Turnout		1081		
Conservative hold		Swing		

=== Longden ===
Longden
Party	Candidate	Votes	%	±%
Liberal Democrats	Roger Evans	986	61.2	
Conservative	Catherine Angela Roberts	560	34.76	
UKIP	Edward Arthur Higginbottom	65	4.03	
Majority				
Turnout		1611		
Liberal Democrats hold		Swing		

=== Loton ===
Loton
Party	Candidate	Votes	%	±%
Conservative	Ed Potter	994	74.57	
Liberal Democrats	Lisa Michelle Walton	213	15.98	
Green	Michelle Jane Sutton-Jones	126	9.45	
Majority				
Turnout		1333		
Conservative hold		Swing		

=== Ludlow East ===
Ludlow East
Party	Candidate	Votes	%	±%
Liberal Democrats	Tracey Huffer	678	64.2	
Conservative	Patricia Ann Price	235	22.25	
Labour	Colin Eric James Sheward	143	13.54	
Majority				
Turnout		1056		
Liberal Democrats hold		Swing		

=== Ludlow North ===
Ludlow North
Party	Candidate	Votes	%	±%
Liberal Democrats	Andy Boddington	897	68.89	
Conservative	Simon Richard Harris	303	23.27	
Green	Linda Mary Senior	54	4.15	
UKIP	Chris Woodward	48	3.69	
Majority				
Turnout		1302		
Liberal Democrats gain from Conservative		Swing		

=== Ludlow South ===
Ludlow South
Party	Candidate	Votes	%	±%
Liberal Democrats	Viv Parry	918	65.81	
Conservative	Fiona Margaret Pizzoni	376	26.95	
Labour	Michael John Penn	101	7.24	
Majority				
Turnout		1395		
Liberal Democrats gain from Conservative		Swing		

=== Market Drayton East ===
Market Drayton East
Party	Candidate	Votes	%	±%
Conservative	Roy Aldcroft	829	73.23	
Labour	Rob Bentley	303	26.77	
Majority				
Turnout		1132		
Conservative hold		Swing		

=== Market Drayton West ===
Market Drayton West (2 seats)
Party	Candidate	Votes	%	±%
Conservative	David Minnery	840	49.91	
Conservative	Roger Hughes	835	49.61	
Labour	Darren Michael Taylor	472	28.05	
Labour	Lin Surridge	462	27.45	
Green	Rodger Sydney Bradley	318	18.89	
Majority				
Majority				
Turnout		1706		
Conservative hold		Swing		
Conservative hold		Swing		

=== Meole ===
Meole
Party	Candidate	Votes	%	±%
Conservative	Nic Laurens	710	55.43	
Labour	Rod Turner	352	27.48	
Liberal Democrats	Slawomir Adam Fejfer	155	12.1	
Green	Tom Heyek	64	5	
Majority				
Turnout		1281		
Conservative hold		Swing		

=== Monkmoor ===
Monkmoor
Party	Candidate	Votes	%	±%
Labour	Pam Moseley	693	71.15	
Conservative	Valerie Adele Lingen-Jones	281	28.85	
Majority				
Turnout		974		
Labour hold		Swing		

=== Much Wenlock ===
Much Wenlock (uncontested)
Party	Candidate	Votes	%	±%
Conservative	David Turner	0	0	
Majority				
Turnout		N/A		
Conservative hold		Swing		

=== Oswestry East ===
Oswestry East (2 seats)
Party	Candidate	Votes	%	±%
Conservative	John William Price	778	45.39	
Conservative	Clare Victoria Aspinall	605	35.30	
Independent	Peter Cherrington	342	19.95	
Labour	Carl Hopley	315	18.38	
Independent	Martin Bennett	289	16.86	
Green	Mike Isherwood	286	16.69	
Green	David Matthew Bennett	254	14.82	
Liberal Democrats	Amanda Jane Woof	97	5.66	
Liberal Democrats	Lee Kelvin Bennett	70	4.08	
Majority				
Majority				
Turnout		1729		
Conservative gain from Independent		Swing		
Conservative hold		Swing		

=== Oswestry South ===
Oswestry South
Party	Candidate	Votes	%	±%
Conservative	David Paul Milner	703	52.35	
Green	Duncan Kerr	640	47.65	
Majority				
Turnout		1343		
Conservative hold		Swing		

=== Oswestry West ===
Oswestry West
Party	Candidate	Votes	%	±%
Conservative	Vince Hunt	432	46.75	
Green	Barry John Edwards	421	45.56	
Liberal Democrats	Romer Wilfred Hoseason	71	7.68	
Majority				
Turnout		924		
Conservative hold		Swing		

=== Porthill ===
Porthill
Party	Candidate	Votes	%	±%
Green	Julian David Geoffrey Dean	662	41.69	
Conservative	Judie McCoy	495	31.17	
Liberal Democrats	David Craddock	431	27.14	
Majority				
Turnout		1,588		
Green gain from Liberal Democrats		Swing		

=== Prees ===
Prees
Party	Candidate	Votes	%	±%
Conservative	Paul Wynn	722	62.13	
Independent	Andrew Gordon Whyte	440	37.87	
Majority				
Turnout		1162		
Conservative hold		Swing		

=== Quarry and Coton Hill ===
Quarry and Coton Hill
Party	Candidate	Votes	%	±%
Liberal Democrats	Nat Green	625	56.36	
Conservative	Arlinda Ballcaj	356	32.1	
Green	Huw Richard Wystan Peach	128	11.54	
Majority				
Turnout		1109		
Liberal Democrats hold		Swing		

=== Radbrook ===
Radbrook
Party	Candidate	Votes	%	±%
Conservative	Keith Roberts	809	58.62	
Liberal Democrats	Ian Edward Cartwright	367	26.59	
Green	John Patrick Newnham	204	14.78	
Majority				
Turnout		1380		
Conservative hold		Swing		

=== Rea Valley ===
Rea Valley
Party	Candidate	Votes	%	±%
Conservative	Nick Hignett	803	55.23	
Liberal Democrats	Susan Catherine Lockwood	565	38.86	
Green	Jonathan Colin Brown	86	5.91	
Majority				
Turnout		1454		
Conservative hold		Swing		

=== Ruyton and Baschurch ===
Ruyton and Baschurch
Party	Candidate	Votes	%	±%
Conservative	Nick Bardsley	852	73.64	
Labour	Graeme Rodger Currie	166	14.35	
Federalist Party	Robert John Jones	79	6.83	
Liberal Democrats	Alex Jones	60	5.19	
Majority				
Turnout		1157		
Conservative hold		Swing		

=== Severn Valley ===
Severn Valley
Party	Candidate	Votes	%	±%
Conservative	Claire Wild	1077	80.01	
Green	Emma Bullard	142	10.55	
Liberal Democrats	Fred Smith	127	9.44	
Majority				
Turnout		1346		
Conservative hold		Swing		

=== Shawbury ===
Shawbury
Party	Candidate	Votes	%	±%
Conservative	Simon Jones	786	76.46	
Green	Steve Boulding	242	23.54	
Conservative hold		Swing		

=== Shifnal North ===
Shifnal North
Party	Candidate	Votes	%	±%
Independent	Kevin Turley	992	81.18	
Conservative	William Colin Cundy	230	18.82	
Majority				
Turnout		1222		
Independent hold		Swing		

=== Shifnal South and Cosford ===
Shifnal South and Cosford
Party	Candidate	Votes	%	±%
Conservative	Stuart West	668	57.14	
Independent	Andy Mitchell	368	31.48	
Liberal Democrats	Jolyon Thomas Hartin	133	11.38	
Majority				
Turnout		1169		
Conservative hold		Swing		

=== St Martin's ===
St Martin's
Party	Candidate	Votes	%	±%
Conservative	Steve Davenport	674	66.54	
Labour	Neil Graham	339	33.46	
Majority				
Turnout		1013		
Conservative hold		Swing		

=== St Oswald ===
St Oswald
Party	Candidate	Votes	%	±%
Conservative	Joyce Barrow	682	59.36	
Independent	Len Evans	467	40.64	
Majority				
Turnout		1149		
Conservative hold		Swing		

=== Sundorne ===
Sundorne
Party	Candidate	Votes	%	±%
Labour	Kevin Pardy	618	73.92	
Conservative	Kayleigh Sarah Gough	218	26.08	
Majority				
Turnout		836		
Labour hold		Swing		

=== Tern ===
Tern
Party	Candidate	Votes	%	±%
Conservative	Lezley May Picton	816	62.62	
Liberal Democrats	Helen Woodman	205	15.73	
Labour Co-op	John Olaf Lewis	204	15.66	
Green	Tony Newby	78	5.99	
Majority				
Turnout		1303		
Conservative hold		Swing		

=== The Meres ===
The Meres
Party	Candidate	Votes	%	±%
Conservative	Brian Williams	905	65.58	
Independent	Patrick James Manners	193	13.99	
Liberal Democrats	Julie Marion Bushell	165	11.96	
Green	Carlo Umberto Ferri	117	8.48	
Majority				
Turnout		1380		
Conservative hold		Swing		

=== Underdale ===
Underdale
Party	Candidate	Votes	%	±%
Liberal Democrats	David George Vasmer	339	36.37	
Labour	Peter Liebich	272	29.18	
Conservative	Ken Vine	257	27.58	
Green	Charlie Bell	64	6.87	
Majority				
Turnout		932		
Liberal Democrats hold		Swing		

=== Wem ===
Wem (2 seats)
Party	Candidate	Votes	%	±%
Liberal Democrats	John Mellings	1,444	63.06	
Independent	Pauline Dee	1,202	52.49	
Conservative	Peter Broomhall	813	35.50	
Conservative	Mark Whittle	396	17.29	
Green	Mel Draycott	255	11.14	
Majority				
Majority				
Turnout		2298		
Liberal Democrats hold		Swing		
Independent hold		Swing		

=== Whitchurch North ===
Whitchurch North (2 seats)
Party	Candidate	Votes	%	±%
Conservative	Peggy Mullock	1,016	72.99	
Conservative	Thomas Biggins	681	48.92	
Green	Liz Lever	421	30.24	
Liberal Democrats	Benedict John Alexander Jephcott	188	13.51	
Green	William Lloyd Jones	133	9.55	
Majority				
Majority				
Turnout		1400		
Conservative hold		Swing		
Conservative hold		Swing		

=== Whitchurch South ===
Whitchurch South
Party	Candidate	Votes	%	±%
Conservative	Gerald Dakin	422	52.62	
Liberal Democrats	Tom Thornhill	156	19.45	
UKIP	Andrea Christabel Allen	132	16.46	
Independent	William Morris Hilton	92	11.47	
Majority				
Turnout		802		
Conservative hold		Swing		

=== Whittington ===
Whittington
Party	Candidate	Votes	%	±%
Conservative	Steve Charmley	613	53.44	
Liberal Democrats	David Walker	298	25.98	
Green	Edward David Goff	152	13.25	
Independent	Christopher Lee Jones	84	7.32	
Majority				
Turnout		1147		
Conservative hold		Swing		

=== Worfield ===
Worfield
Party	Candidate	Votes	%	±%
Conservative	Michael Wood	754	76.78	
Labour	Ann Rochelle	117	11.91	
Liberal Democrats	Helen Elizabeth Howell	111	11.3	
Majority				
Turnout		76.78		
Conservative hold		Swing		
