= 1999 Wyre Forest District Council election =

1999 UK local government election

The 1999 Wyre Forest District Council election took place on 6 May 1999 to elect members of Wyre Forest District Council in Worcestershire, England. One third of the council was up for election and the Labour Party lost overall control of the council to no overall control.

After the election, the composition of the council was:

- Labour 18
- Health Concern 7
- Conservative 5
- Independent 5
- Liberal Democrats 4
- Liberal 3

== Campaign ==
Before the election the council was composed of 24 Labour, 5 Liberal Democrats, 5 Independent Labour, 4 Conservatives, 3 Liberals and 1 Independent councillors. The election saw the Independent Kidderminster Hospital and Health Concern contest seats for the first time in protest against attempts to downgrade Kidderminster General Hospital. They put up candidates for 11 of the 14 seats which were up for election claiming that they had the backing of 100,000 people. As well as the Health Concern candidates, one Independent and three Liberal Party candidates also stood on the issue. However sitting councillors, including the Labour Party who controlled the council, said that they had done everything they could to preserve services at the hospital but that the council could have no effect on decisions over the hospital made by the National Health Service. Labour said that other issues in the election included a redevelopment of Kidderminster town centre and a proposed transfer of council housing to a non-profit organisation.

== Election result ==
Labour lost their majority on the council after Health Concern won 7 of the seats contested, gaining 6 of them from Labour. The local Labour MP David Lock accused the Health Concern campaigners of having gained support by scaremongering over the closure of Kidderminster Hospital, which he said had never been an option.

Wyre Forest local election result 1999
Party	Seats	Gains	Losses	Net gain/loss	Seats %	Votes %	Votes	+/−
Health Concern	7			+7	50.0			
Labour	3			-6	21.4			
Conservative	2			+1	14.3			
Liberal Democrats	1			-1	7.1			
Liberal	1			0	7.1			
Independent	0			-1	0.0			
