= 2013 Shropshire Council election =

2013 UK local government election

- 2 May 2013

All 74 seats to Shropshire Council 38 seats needed for a majority
	First party	Second party	Third party
Party	Conservative	Liberal Democrats	Labour
Seats won	48	12	9
Seat change	▼6	▲1	▲2
- Map showing the results of the 2013 elections. Blue showing Conservative, red showing Labour, yellow showing Liberal Democrats, grey showing independents and pink showing ICHC. Striped divisions have mixed representation.
Council control before election
Conservative
Council control after election
Conservative

The 2013 elections to Shropshire Council were held on 2 May 2013 as part of the 2013 United Kingdom local elections. These were the second elections to the unitary authority created as part of local government restructuring in Shropshire, following on from the previous elections in 2009. All 74 seats in the 63 electoral divisions (consisting of 53 single member divisions, nine 2-member divisions and one 3-member electoral division) were up for election across Shropshire. At the same time, all town and parish council contested elections took place, most notably including Shrewsbury Town Council.

The Conservative party retained control of the council, though with a slightly reduced majority, with 3 fewer seats compared to just prior to the election.

All locally registered electors (British, Irish, Commonwealth and European Union citizens) who were aged 18 or over on Thursday 2 May 2013 were entitled to vote in the local elections. Those who were temporarily away from their ordinary address (for example, away working, on holiday, in student accommodation or in hospital) were also entitled to vote in the local elections.

== Previous council ==
Shropshire Council was Conservative controlled prior to the 2013 election, with 51 Conservative councillors immediately before the election. The Conservatives won 54 seats at the 2009 election, but lost three of these in by-elections during the term.

The Liberal Democrats won 11 seats at the 2009 election, but increased their numbers to 14 during the term, gaining at the by-elections from the Conservatives. Labour had 7 seats, Independent Community and Health Concern one seat, and a final seat was held by an independent.

=== Changes to divisions ===
There were no changes to division boundaries or seat allocations since 2009, but two divisions changed their names: 'Minsterley' to 'Rea Valley', and 'Selattyn and Gobowen' to 'Gobowen, Selattyn and Western Rhyn'.

== Uncontested elections ==
In six electoral divisions the number of candidates nominated equalled the number of councillors to be elected, so these seats were uncontested. They were Corvedale, Shawbury, St Oswald, The Meres, Whitchurch North (two members), and Whitchurch South. The seven candidates elected unopposed were all Conservatives. This resulted in more than 20,000 people being refused a vote including the whole town of Whitchurch.

== Results ==
The results, according to the council's website:

=== Summary ===
Shropshire Council election, 2013
Party	Seats	Gains	Losses	Net gain/loss	Seats %	Votes %	Votes	+/−
Conservative	48			-6			26,578	
Liberal Democrats	12			+1			15,979	
Labour	9			+2			17,592	
Health Concern	1			±0			1,181	
Independent	4			+3			5,206	
UKIP	0	0	0	0	0.0		9,318	
Green	0	0	0	0	0.0		1,080	
BNP	0	0	0	0	0.0		615	
Total							77,549	

=== Abbey ===
Abbey
Party	Candidate	Votes	%	±%
Liberal Democrats	Hannah Fraser	675	51.9	+6.6
Conservative	Maria Felton	247	19.0	−25.9
UKIP	Jenny Price	164	12.6	N/A
Labour	Paul Morris	154	11.8	N/A
Green	John Brown	61	4.7	−5.3
Majority		428		
Turnout		1,308	43.2	
Liberal Democrats gain from Conservative		Swing		

=== Albrighton ===
Albrighton
Party	Candidate	Votes	%	±%
Conservative	Malcolm Pate	690	55.0	
UKIP	John Smith	273	21.8	
Labour	Deborah Williams-Ruth	173	13.8	
Green	Phil Harrison	119	9.4	
Majority				
Turnout				
Conservative hold		Swing		

=== Alveley and Claverley ===
Alveley and Claverley
Party	Candidate	Votes	%	±%
Conservative	Tina Woodward	653	59.5	
UKIP	Vanessa Lee	270	24.6	
Liberal Democrats	Frederick Voysey	175	16.0	
Majority				
Turnout				
Conservative hold		Swing		

=== Bagley ===
Bagley
Party	Candidate	Votes	%	±%
Conservative	Dean Carroll	354	32.7	−8.8
Liberal Democrats	Beverley Baker	346	31.9	−26.6
Labour Co-op	Ashley Vaughan-Evans	324	29.9	N/A
Green	Kayleigh Gough	59	5.4	N/A
Majority		8		
Turnout		1,089	30.5	
Conservative gain from Liberal Democrats		Swing		

=== Battlefield ===
Battlefield
Party	Candidate	Votes	%	±%
Conservative	Malcolm Price	389	62.0	0.0
Labour Co-op	Connor Jones	238	38.0	+16.2
Majority		151	24.1	
Turnout		636	21.9	
Conservative hold		Swing		

=== Bayston Hill, Column and Sutton ===
Bayston Hill, Column and Sutton (3)
Party	Candidate	Votes	%	±%
Labour	Ted Clarke	2,286	21.3	+2.4
Labour	Jon Tandy	2,256	21.0	+3.1
Labour	Jane Mackenzie	1,866	17.5	+0.4
Conservative	Will Coles	1,139	10.6	−5.8
Conservative	Chris Lewis	1,105	10.3	−5.8
Conservative	Tim Milsom	934	8.7	−4.9
UKIP	Terrence Lee	848	7.9	N/A
Liberal Democrats	Robert Lea	293	2.7	N/A
Majority				
Majority				
Majority				
Turnout		4,062	41.5	
Labour hold		Swing		
Labour hold		Swing		
Labour hold		Swing		

=== Belle Vue ===
Belle Vue
Party	Candidate	Votes	%	±%
Labour	Mansel Williams	939	76.5	+28.1
Conservative	Valerie Jones	289	23.5	−11.2
Majority		650		
Turnout		1,236	36.1	
Labour hold		Swing		

=== Bishop's Castle ===
Bishop's Castle
Party	Candidate	Votes	%	±%
Liberal Democrats	Charlotte Barnes	907	62.0	
Conservative	James Garnier	449	30.7	
Green	Hilary Wendt	107	7.3	
Majority				
Turnout				
Liberal Democrats hold		Swing		

=== Bowbrook ===
Bowbrook
Party	Candidate	Votes	%	±%
Conservative	Peter Adams	604	65.6	−9.7
Labour Co-op	Danny Sweeney	317	34.4	+9.7
Majority		287		
Turnout		937	31.5	
Conservative hold		Swing		

=== Bridgnorth East and Astley Abbotts ===
Bridgnorth East and Astley Abbotts (2)
Party	Candidate	Votes	%	±%
Conservative	Christian Lea	704	25.0	
Conservative	William Parr	614	21.8	
UKIP	Adrian Thomas	446	16.6	
UKIP	Sam Whitehouse	433	15.4	
Liberal Democrats	Vanessa Voysey	304	10.8	
Liberal Democrats	Glynis Frater	290	10.3	
Majority				
Turnout				
Conservative hold		Swing		
Conservative hold		Swing		

=== Bridgnorth West and Tasley ===
Bridgnorth West and Tasley (2)
Party	Candidate	Votes	%	±%
Conservative	Les Winwood	830	26.8	
Conservative	John Hurst-Knight	656	21.6	
UKIP	Rod Evans	530	17.1	
UKIP	Roger Hipkiss	447	14.5	
Liberal Democrats	Helen Howell	372	12.0	
Liberal Democrats	Davis Walker	259	8.4	
Majority				
Majority				
Turnout				
Conservative hold		Swing		
Conservative hold		Swing		

=== Broseley ===
Broseley
Party	Candidate	Votes	%	±%
Labour	Jean Jones	706	65.7	
UKIP	Derek Armstrong	235	21.9	
Conservative	Colin Cundy	133	12.4	
Majority				
Turnout				
Labour hold		Swing		

=== Brown Clee ===
Brown Clee
Party	Candidate	Votes	%	±%
Conservative	Robert Tindall	486	50.5	
Independent	George Lee	250	26.0	
UKIP	Stephen Dean	226	23.5	
Majority				
Turnout				
Conservative hold		Swing		

=== Burnell ===
Burnell
Party	Candidate	Votes	%	±%
Conservative	Tim Barker	937	65.3	−9.8
Liberal Democrats	Kate King	499	34.7	+9.8
Majority		438	30.5	
Turnout		1,462	43.2	
Conservative hold		Swing		

=== Castlefields and Ditherington ===
Castlefields and Ditherington
Party	Candidate	Votes	%	±%
Labour	Alan Mosley	937	86.1	+28.9
Conservative	Jenny Hodges	108	9.9	−12.1
Liberal Democrats	Janine Clarke	43	4.0	N/A
Majority		829		
Turnout		1,094	31.3	
Labour hold		Swing		

=== Cheswardine ===
Cheswardine
Party	Candidate	Votes	%	±%
Conservative	Andrew Davies	545	70.9	
Labour	Mark Williams	224	29.1	
Majority				
Turnout				
Conservative hold		Swing		

=== Chirbury and Worthen ===
Chirbury and Worthen
Party	Candidate	Votes	%	±%
Liberal Democrats	Heather Kidd	1012	81.3	
Conservative	Andrew Sayer	233	18.7	
Majority		779		
Turnout		1,256	52.3	
Liberal Democrats hold		Swing		

=== Church Stretton and Craven Arms ===
Church Stretton and Craven Arms (2)
Party	Candidate	Votes	%	±%
Conservative	Lee Chapman	1423	28.5	
Conservative	David Evans	1284	25.7	
Liberal Democrats	Bob Welch	885	17.7	
Liberal Democrats	Anne Dyer	741	14.9	
Labour	Jean Gray	382	7.7	
Labour	Michael Penn	275	5.5	
Majority				
Majority				
Turnout				
Conservative hold		Swing		
Conservative hold		Swing		

=== Clee ===
Clee
Party	Candidate	Votes	%	±%
Liberal Democrats	Richard Huffer	721	48.7	
Conservative	James Wheeler	654	44.2	
Labour	Sam Mann	105	7.1	
Majority				
Turnout				
Liberal Democrats gain from Conservative		Swing		

=== Cleobury Mortimer ===
Cleobury Mortimer (2)
Party	Candidate	Votes	%	±%
Health Concern	Madge Shineton	1181	35.6	
Conservative	Gwilym Butler	1011	30.5	
UKIP	Maurice Alton	673	20.3	
Independent	Peter Martin	452	13.7	
Majority				
Majority				
Turnout				
Health Concern hold		Swing		
Conservative hold		Swing		

=== Clun ===
Clun
Party	Candidate	Votes	%	±%
Liberal Democrats	Nigel Hartin	714	45.7	
Conservative	Jackie Williams	522	33.4	
UKIP	Deborah Brownlee	195	12.5	
Green	Janet Phillips	131	8.4	
Majority		192		
Turnout		1,566	50.2	
Liberal Democrats hold		Swing		

=== Copthorne ===
Copthorne
Party	Candidate	Votes	%	±%
Conservative	Peter Nutting	569	49.7	−4.0
Labour	Mark Jones	240	21.0	N/A
UKIP	John Price	234	20.5	N/A
Liberal Democrats	Trudy Smith	101	8.8	−37.5
Majority		229		
Turnout		1,152	36.7	
Conservative hold		Swing		

=== Corvedale ===
Corvedale
Party	Candidate	Votes	%	±%
Conservative	Cecilia Motley			
Conservative hold		Swing		

=== Ellesmere Urban ===
Ellesmere Urban
Party	Candidate	Votes	%	±%
Conservative	Elizabeth Hartley	478	52.9	
Liberal Democrats	Brian Knight	425	47.1	
Majority				
Turnout				
Conservative hold		Swing		

=== Gobowen, Selattyn and Weston Rhyn ===
In 2009 this division was named Selattyn and Gobowen.

Gobowen, Selattyn and Weston Rhyn (2)
Party	Candidate	Votes	%	±%
Conservative	David Lloyd	747	37.7	
Conservative	Robert Macey	655	33.1	
Independent	Paul Jones	578	29.2	
Majority				
Majority				
Turnout				
Conservative hold		Swing		
Conservative gain from Liberal Democrats		Swing		

=== Harlescott ===
Harlescott
Party	Candidate	Votes	%	±%
Labour	Vernon Bushell	604	68.7	+28.9
Conservative	Phil Sandford	275	31.3	−2.9
Majority		329		
Turnout		890	26.1	
Labour hold		Swing		

=== Highley ===
Highley
Party	Candidate	Votes	%	±%
Independent	Dave Tremellen	374	55.3	
UKIP	Paul Brown	178	26.3	
Liberal Democrats	David Voysey	124	18.3	
Majority				
Turnout				
Independent gain from Liberal Democrats		Swing		

=== Hodnet ===
Hodnet
Party	Candidate	Votes	%	±%
Conservative	Karen Calder	549	67.6	
UKIP	Andrew Carter	263	32.4	
Majority				
Turnout				
Conservative hold		Swing		

=== Llanymynech ===
Llanymynech
Party	Candidate	Votes	%	±%
Conservative	Arthur Walpole	654	67.4	
UKIP	John Adlington	317	32.6	
Majority				
Turnout				
Conservative hold		Swing		

=== Longden ===
Longden
Party	Candidate	Votes	%	±%
Liberal Democrats	Roger Evans	817	51.5	−6.9
Conservative	Dan Morris	531	33.5	−8.1
UKIP	Ian Minshall	138	8.7	N/A
Labour Co-op	Mohan Jones	100	6.3	N/A
Majority		286		
Turnout		1,593	50.0	
Liberal Democrats hold		Swing		

=== Loton ===
Loton
Party	Candidate	Votes	%	±%
Conservative	David Roberts	927	80.1	+5.3
Liberal Democrats	Fred Smith	230	19.9	−5.3
Majority		697		
Turnout		1,187	38.2	
Conservative hold		Swing		

=== Ludlow East ===
Ludlow East
Party	Candidate	Votes	%	±%
Liberal Democrats	Tracey Huffer	467	50.5	
Conservative	Diane Lyle	210	22.7	
Labour	Colin Sheward	184	19.9	
Green	Imogen Jones	64	6.9	
Majority		257		
Turnout		947	29.4	
Liberal Democrats hold		Swing		

=== Ludlow North ===
Ludlow North
Party	Candidate	Votes	%	±%
Conservative	Rosanna Taylor-Smith	505	40.4	
Liberal Democrats	Andy Boddington	420	33.6	
UKIP	Chris Woodward	126	10.1	
Labour	James Hooper	109	8.7	
Green	Frances Newman	69	5.5	
Independent	Jennifer Leyton-Purrier	21	1.7	
Majority		85		
Turnout		1,252	40.6	
Conservative hold		Swing		

=== Ludlow South ===
Ludlow South
Party	Candidate	Votes	%	±%
Liberal Democrats	Vivienne Parry	639	47.2	
Conservative	Martin Taylor-Smith	415	30.6	
Independent	Graeme Perks	182	13.4	
UKIP	Maurice Knott	119	8.8	
Majority		224		
Turnout		1,358	42.2	
Liberal Democrats gain from Conservative		Swing		

=== Market Drayton East ===
Market Drayton East
Party	Candidate	Votes	%	±%
Conservative	John Cadwallader	524	45.6	
Independent	Roy Aldcroft	272	23.7	
Labour	Darren Taylor	241	21.0	
Independent	Roy Tydeman	112	9.8	
Majority				
Turnout				
Conservative hold		Swing		

=== Market Drayton West ===
Market Drayton West (2)
Party	Candidate	Votes	%	±%
Conservative	Roger Hughes	684	23.1	
Conservative	David Minnery	653	22.0	
UKIP	Steve Glover	592	20.0	
Labour	Val Taylor	487	16.4	
Labour	Rob Bentley	417	14.1	
BNP	Phil Reddall	134	4.5	
Majority				
Majority				
Turnout				
Conservative hold		Swing		
Conservative hold		Swing		

=== Meole ===
Meole
Party	Candidate	Votes	%	±%
Conservative	Michael Owen	689	54.9	−16.4
Labour Co-op	David French	473	37.7	N/A
Liberal Democrats	Margaret Hamer	92	7.3	−21.4
Majority		216		
Turnout		1,274	39.9	
Conservative hold		Swing		

=== Monkmoor ===
Monkmoor
Party	Candidate	Votes	%	±%
Labour	Pam Moseley	658	62.1	+13.3
Conservative	Tony Durnell	328	31.0	−20.2
Liberal Democrats	Grant Pennington	73	6.9	N/A
Majority		330		
Turnout		1,067	31.5	
Labour gain from Conservative		Swing		

=== Much Wenlock ===
Much Wenlock
Party	Candidate	Votes	%	±%
Conservative	David Turner	691	48.7	
Liberal Democrats	Joff Watson	293	20.7	
Independent	David Gibbon	140	9.8	
Independent	Lesley Durbin	113	8.0	
Independent	Phill Hipkiss	113	8.0	
Independent	Malcolm Macintyre-Read	68	4.8	
Majority				
Turnout				
Conservative hold		Swing		

=== Oswestry East ===
Oswestry East (2)
Party	Candidate	Votes	%	±%
Independent	Peter Cherrington	611	25.8	
Conservative	Martin Bennett	583	24.7	
Labour	Graeme Currie	551	23.4	
Conservative	Chris Schofield	453	19.1	
BNP	Jim Matthys	169	7.1	
Majority				
Majority				
Turnout				
Independent gain from Conservative		Swing		
Conservative hold		Swing		

=== Oswestry South ===
Oswestry South
Party	Candidate	Votes	%	±%
Conservative	Keith Barrow	488	50.0	
Green	Duncan Kerr	337	31.7	
UKIP	Penny Cotton	175	16.5	
Liberal Democrats	Romer Hoseason	62	5.8	
Majority				
Turnout				
Conservative hold		Swing		

=== Oswestry West ===
Oswestry West
Party	Candidate	Votes	%	±%
Conservative	Vince Hunt	588	79.4	
BNP	Alice Matthys	145	20.6	
Majority				
Turnout				
Conservative hold		Swing		

=== Porthill ===
Porthill
Party	Candidate	Votes	%	±%
Liberal Democrats	Anne Chebsey	501	39.9	−16.9
Conservative	Judie McCoy	432	34.4	−8.8
Labour	Amy Liebich	189	15.1	N/A
Green	Alan Whittaker	133	10.6	N/A
Majority		69		
Turnout		1,266	37.3	
Liberal Democrats hold		Swing		

=== Prees ===
Prees
Party	Candidate	Votes	%	±%
Conservative	Paul Wynn	614	63.4	
UKIP	Andrew Irvine-List	355	36.6	
Majority				
Turnout				
Conservative hold		Swing		

=== Quarry and Coton Hill ===
Quarry and Coton Hill
Party	Candidate	Votes	%	±%
Liberal Democrats	Andrew Bannerman	451	47.1	+5.3
Conservative	Carol Foster	311	32.5	+1.0
Labour Co-op	John Lewis	196	20.5	−2.6
Majority		140		
Turnout		966	30.7	
Liberal Democrats gain from Conservative		Swing		

=== Radbrook ===
Radbrook
Party	Candidate	Votes	%	±%
Conservative	Keith Roberts	592	45.8	−5.2
Liberal Democrats	Christine Tinker	398	30.8	−18.2
Labour	Jeanette Petherbridge	302	23.4	N/A
Majority		194		
Turnout		1,302	38.5	
Conservative hold		Swing		

=== Rea Valley ===
In 2009 this division was named Minsterley.

Rea Valley
Party	Candidate	Votes	%	±%
Conservative	Tudor Bebb	512	49.0	−11.5
UKIP	Peter Lewis	298	28.5	N/A
Labour Co-op	Joe Crosland	137	13.1	N/A
Liberal Democrats	David Ellams	98	9.4	−15.6
Majority		214		
Turnout		1,048	32.5	
Conservative hold		Swing		

=== Ruyton and Baschurch ===
Ruyton and Baschurch
Party	Candidate	Votes	%	±%
Conservative	Nicholas Bardsley	371	34.6	
UKIP	Jonathan Carr	331	30.9	
Liberal Democrats	Colin Case	279	26.0	
Labour	Netty Brook	91	8.5	
Majority				
Turnout				
Conservative hold		Swing		

=== Severn Valley ===
Severn Valley
Party	Candidate	Votes	%	±%
Conservative	Claire Wild	946	78.2	N/A
Labour Co-op	Jeevan Jones	174	14.4	N/A
Liberal Democrats	Rob Harper	90	7.4	N/A
Majority		772		
Turnout		1,226	36.2	
Conservative hold		Swing		

=== Shawbury ===
Shawbury
Party	Candidate	Votes	%	±%
Conservative	Simon Jones			
Conservative hold		Swing		

=== Shifnal North ===
Shifnal North
Party	Candidate	Votes	%	±%
Independent	Kevin Turley	524	40.1	
Conservative	Gordon Tonkinson	446	34.2	
UKIP	Richard Choudhary	234	17.9	
Independent	John Horne	102	7.8	
Majority				
Turnout				
Independent gain from Conservative		Swing		

=== Shifnal South and Cosford ===
Shifnal South and Cosford
Party	Candidate	Votes	%	±%
Conservative	Stuart West	658	59.8	
UKIP	Andrew Mitchell	443	40.2	
Majority				
Turnout				
Conservative hold		Swing		

=== St Martin's ===
St Martin's
Party	Candidate	Votes	%	±%
Conservative	Steve Davenport	465	48.8	
Labour	Hannah Guntrip	301	31.6	
Independent	Neil Graham	187	19.6	
Majority				
Turnout				
Conservative hold		Swing		

=== St Oswald ===
St Oswald
Party	Candidate	Votes	%	±%
Conservative	Joyce Barrow			
Conservative hold		Swing		

=== Sundorne ===
Sundorne
Party	Candidate	Votes	%	±%
Labour	Kevin Pardy	545	66.2	+30.1
Conservative	Karen Burgoyne	219	26.6	−19.6
BNP	Karl Foulkes	59	7.2	−10.4
Majority		326		
Turnout		833	26.3	
Labour gain from Conservative		Swing		

=== Tern ===
Tern
Party	Candidate	Votes	%	±%
Conservative	John Everall	721	61.6	−0.4
Labour Co-op	Kathryn Brooke	249	21.3	N/A
Liberal Democrats	Helen Woodman	200	17.1	−20.9
Majority		472		
Turnout		1,183	33.2	
Conservative hold		Swing		

=== The Meres ===
The Meres
Party	Candidate	Votes	%	±%
Conservative	Brian Williams			
Conservative hold		Swing		

=== Underdale ===
Underdale
Party	Candidate	Votes	%	±%
Liberal Democrats	Miles Kenny	661	64.6	−3.1
Labour Co-op	Sue Batchelor	162	15.8	+6.4
UKIP	Jan Allmark	122	11.9	N/A
Conservative	Robert Osborne	78	7.6	−2.4
Majority		499		
Turnout		1,032	32.4	
Liberal Democrats hold		Swing		

=== Wem ===
Wem (2)
Party	Candidate	Votes	%	±%
Liberal Democrats	John Mellings	1,322	39.0	
Independent	Pauline Dee	1,107	32.7	
Conservative	Peter Broomhall	782	23.1	
BNP	Ian Deakin	108	5.3	
Majority				
Majority				
Turnout				
Liberal Democrats hold		Swing		
Independent hold		Swing		

=== Whitchurch North ===
Whitchurch North (2)
Party	Candidate	Votes	%	±%
Conservative	Thomas Biggins			
Conservative	Peggy Mullock			
Conservative hold		Swing		
Conservative hold		Swing		

=== Whitchurch South ===
Whitchurch South
Party	Candidate	Votes	%	±%
Conservative	Gerald Dakin			
Conservative hold		Swing		

=== Whittington ===
Whittington
Party	Candidate	Votes	%	±%
Conservative	Steve Charmley	517	56.6	
UKIP	David Baynham	397	43.4	
Majority				
Turnout				
Conservative hold		Swing		

=== Worfield ===
Worfield
Party	Candidate	Votes	%	±%
Conservative	Michael Wood	607	70.3	
UKIP	Brian Seymour	256	29.7	
Majority				
Turnout				
Conservative hold		Swing		
