= 2007 Wyre Forest District Council election =

2007 UK local government election

Map of the results of the 2007 Wyre Forest District Council election. Conservatives in blue, Health Concern in pink, Labour in red, Liberal in orange and Liberal Democrats in yellow. Wards in grey were not contested in 2007.

The 2007 Wyre Forest District Council election took place on 3 May 2007 to elect members of Wyre Forest District Council in Worcestershire, England. One third of the council was up for election and the council stayed under no overall control.

After the election, the composition of the council was:

- Conservative 18
- Health Concern 10
- Liberal 7
- Labour 3
- Liberal Democrats 2
- Independent 2

== Election result ==
The Conservatives remained the largest party on the council after winning 5 seats, but failing to gain a majority. They gained a seat in Bewdley and Arley ward but lost one back in Mitton. Health Concern were the only party to increase their number of seats after taking a seat from Labour by 11 votes in Areley Kings. The defeated Labour councillor was their leader on the council, Jamie Shaw, who had been a councillor for 23 years. The Liberals held both the seats they were defending, with Mike Price holding Offmore and Comberton where a long term councillor Mike Oborski had died in February.

Following the election the leader of the council, Conservative Stephen Clee, stood down after 3 years in charge of the council after the disappointing results for his party. He had been leader of his party in Wyre Forest for 6 years and was succeeded by John Campion.

Wyre Forest local election result 2007
Party	Seats	Gains	Losses	Net gain/loss	Seats %	Votes %	Votes	+/−
Conservative	5	1	1	0	35.7	35.7	8,486	-3.8%
Health Concern	4	2	1	+1	28.6	30.8	7,327	-1.5%
Labour	2	0	1	-1	14.3	15.8	3,760	-0.1%
Liberal	2	0	0	0	14.3	10.4	2,463	+1.6%
Liberal Democrats	1	0	0	0	7.1	6.0	1,434	+2.9%
Green	0	0	0	0	0	0.7	169	+0.5%
Independent	0	0	0	0	0	0.5	120	+0.3%

== Ward results ==
Aggborough and Spennells
Party	Candidate	Votes	%	±%
Liberal Democrats	Peter Dyke	787	39.7	+15.8
Conservative	Ammar Ahmad	648	32.7	−13.8
Health Concern	John Griffiths	422	21.3	+0.3
Labour	Adrian Sewell	127	6.4	+0.1
Majority		139	7.0	
Turnout		1,984	38.1	+2.4
Liberal Democrats hold		Swing		

Areley Kings
Party	Candidate	Votes	%	±%
Health Concern	John Thomas	648	33.7	−5.1
Labour	James Shaw	637	33.2	+10.2
Conservative	Michael Partridge	636	33.1	−5.1
Majority		11	0.5	
Turnout		1,921	41.2	+3.7
Health Concern gain from Labour		Swing		

Bewdley and Arley
Party	Candidate	Votes	%	±%
Conservative	Jennifer Greener	956	46.4	+0.7
Health Concern	Mavis Baillie	584	28.3	−4.6
Labour	William Mason	383	18.6	−2.8
Liberal Democrats	Michael Dixon	138	6.7	+6.7
Majority		372	18.1	+5.3
Turnout		2,061	39.0	−3.2
Conservative gain from Health Concern		Swing		

Blakebrook and Chaddesley
Party	Candidate	Votes	%	±%
Conservative	Stephen Williams	unopposed		
Conservative hold		Swing		

Broadwaters
Party	Candidate	Votes	%	±%
Health Concern	Kenneth Stokes	822	41.7	+9.1
Conservative	Mumshad Ahmed	498	25.3	−2.2
Liberal	Shazu Miah	399	20.2	−5.6
Labour	Paul Mills	253	12.8	−1.4
Majority		324	16.4	+11.3
Turnout		1,972	38.1	+5.6
Health Concern hold		Swing		

Cookley
Party	Candidate	Votes	%	±%
Labour	Christopher Nicholls	448	46.9	+0.2
Conservative	Julian Phillips	224	23.4	−8.4
Health Concern	Caroline Godfrey	128	13.4	−8.2
Independent	Stephen Rushton	120	12.6	+12.6
Liberal Democrats	Vicky Dixon	36	3.8	+3.8
Majority		224	23.5	+8.6
Turnout		956	48.4	−2.0
Labour hold		Swing		

Franche
Party	Candidate	Votes	%	±%
Conservative	Anne Hingley	1,087	50.4	+16.3
Health Concern	Christopher Thomas	578	26.8	−12.3
Labour	Leroy Wright	403	18.7	−8.1
Liberal	Kevin Hill	90	4.2	+4.2
Majority		509	23.6	
Turnout		2,158	39.7	−1.5
Conservative hold		Swing		

Greenhill
Party	Candidate	Votes	%	±%
Liberal	Paul Harrison	971	52.3	+2.4
Health Concern	Margaret Bradley	477	25.7	+2.8
Conservative	Paul Marchant	294	15.8	+0.4
Green	Vicky Dunn	114	6.1	+6.1
Majority		494	26.6	−0.4
Turnout		1,856	31.1	−1.1
Liberal hold		Swing		

Habberley and Blakebrook
Party	Candidate	Votes	%	±%
Labour	Michael Kelly	736	35.6	+10.2
Health Concern	Elizabeth Davies	641	31.0	−7.9
Conservative	Arthur Buckley	590	28.5	−7.2
Liberal	Alane Harvey	102	4.9	+4.9
Majority		95	4.6	
Turnout		2,069	39.8	−2.0
Labour hold		Swing		

Lickhill
Party	Candidate	Votes	%	±%
Health Concern	Jill Fairbrother-Millis	1,081	55.1	+1.4
Conservative	David Little	624	31.8	−1.9
Labour	Donovan Giles	207	10.6	−2.0
Liberal Democrats	Clive Parsons	50	2.5	+2.5
Majority		457	23.3	+3.3
Turnout		1,962	35.5	−0.1
Health Concern hold		Swing		

Mitton
Party	Candidate	Votes	%	±%
Health Concern	David Millis	827	42.6	−0.8
Conservative	June Salter	819	42.2	−1.8
Labour	Gary Watson	205	10.6	−2.0
Liberal Democrats	Pamela Dixon	89	4.6	+4.6
Majority		8	0.4	
Turnout		1,940	34.7	−0.2
Health Concern gain from Conservative		Swing		

Offmore and Comberton
Party	Candidate	Votes	%	±%
Liberal	Michael Price	901	44.3	+6.4
Conservative	Gillian Onslow	686	33.8	−0.4
Health Concern	James Parish	291	14.3	−3.2
Labour	Daniel Watson	154	7.6	−2.8
Majority		235	10.5	+6.8
Turnout		2,032	37.8	−4.9
Liberal hold		Swing		

Sutton Park
Party	Candidate	Votes	%	±%
Conservative	Tracey Onslow	911	47.3	−2.2
Health Concern	Raymond Barber	513	26.6	−2.7
Liberal Democrats	Samantha Walker	294	15.3	+7.8
Labour	David Prain	207	10.8	−2.8
Majority		398	20.7	+0.5
Turnout		1,925	35.2	+0.7
Conservative hold		Swing		

Wolverley
Party	Candidate	Votes	%	±%
Conservative	Malcolm Hazlewood	513	55.6	+9.2
Health Concern	Nigel Addison	315	34.1	+34.1
Green	Katherine Spohrer	55	6.0	+6.0
Liberal Democrats	Adrian Beavis	40	4.3	+4.3
Majority		198	21.5	+14.0
Turnout		923	52.3	−2.1
Conservative hold		Swing		
