= 2010 Wyre Forest District Council election =

2010 UK local government election

Map of the results of the 2010 Wyre Forest District Council election. Conservatives in blue, Health Concern in pink and Liberals in orange. Wards in grey were not contested in 2010.

The 2010 Wyre Forest District Council election took place on 6 May 2010 to elect members of Wyre Forest District Council in Worcestershire, England. One third of the council was up for election and the Conservative Party gained overall control of the council from no overall control.

After the election, the composition of the council was:

- Conservative 23
- Health Concern 8
- Liberal 5
- Labour 3
- Liberal Democrats 2
- Independent 1

== Election result ==
Overall turnout at the election was 65.6%.

Wyre Forest local election result 2010
Party	Seats	Gains	Losses	Net gain/loss	Seats %	Votes %	Votes	+/−
Conservative	9	2	0	+2	64.3	39.1	18,175	-2.0%
Health Concern	3	0	2	-2	21.4	24.8	11,517	+0.1%
Liberal	2	0	0	0	14.3	6.9	3,216	-3.5%
Labour	0	0	0	0	0	18.6	8,657	+4.8%
Liberal Democrats	0	0	0	0	0	9.0	4,190	+2.7%
Green	0	0	0	0	0	1.6	765	+1.6%

== Ward results ==
Aggborough and Spennells
Party	Candidate	Votes	%	±%
Conservative	John Aston	1,349	38.1	+9.8
Liberal Democrats	David Ross	1,216	34.3	−15.7
Health Concern	Peter Young	591	16.7	+0.9
Labour	Leroy Wright	386	10.9	+4.9
Majority		133	3.8	
Turnout		3,542	68.0	+33.0
Conservative hold		Swing		

Areley Kings
Party	Candidate	Votes	%	±%
Health Concern	Nigel Thomas	1,176	38.8	+9.6
Conservative	Kenneth Henderson	1,096	36.2	+1.0
Labour	Violet Higgs	757	25.0	−7.8
Majority		80	2.6	
Turnout		3,029	66.1	+25.2
Health Concern hold		Swing		

Bewdley and Arley
Party	Candidate	Votes	%	±%
Conservative	Stephen Clee	1,550	39.9	−2.2
Health Concern	Derek Killingworth	1,070	27.5	+7.5
Liberal Democrats	Dorothy Smith	715	18.4	+18.4
Labour	Samuel Arnold	549	14.1	+0.0
Majority		480	12.4	−5.9
Turnout		3,884	72.9	+31.9
Conservative hold		Swing		

Blakedown and Chaddesley
Party	Candidate	Votes	%	±%
Conservative	Pauline Hayward	1,685	67.4	
Health Concern	Elizabeth Davies	572	22.9	
Labour	Diana Udall	243	9.7	
Majority		1,113	44.5	
Turnout		2,500	76.5	
Conservative hold		Swing		

Broadwaters
Party	Candidate	Votes	%	±%
Health Concern	Howard Martin	1,345	38.4	+13.6
Conservative	Steven Walker	1,147	32.7	+0.2
Labour	Adrian Sewell	781	22.3	+12.6
Green	John Harris	233	6.6	+6.6
Majority		198	5.6	
Turnout		3,506	59.0	+29.1
Health Concern hold		Swing		

Franche
Party	Candidate	Votes	%	±%
Conservative	Daniel McCann	1,374	36.7	−18.2
Labour	Nigel Knowles	943	25.2	+10.4
Health Concern	Michael Shellie	884	23.6	−2.9
Liberal Democrats	Michael Dixon	446	11.9	+11.9
Green	Phillip Oliver	94	2.5	+2.5
Majority		431	11.5	−16.9
Turnout		3,741	68.8	+31.0
Conservative gain from Health Concern		Swing		

Greenhill
Party	Candidate	Votes	%	±%
Liberal	Timothy Ingham	1,567	41.7	−10.5
Conservative	Christopher Morrall	1,181	31.4	+12.5
Labour	Paul Mills	762	20.3	+11.6
Green	Alexandra Heelis	248	6.6	+6.6
Majority		386	10.3	−21.7
Turnout		3,758	61.8	+32.3
Liberal hold		Swing		

Habberley and Blakebrook
Party	Candidate	Votes	%	±%
Conservative	Ian Hardiman	1,275	36.8	−2.8
Labour	Barry McFarland	842	24.3	−2.1
Health Concern	Gillian Carr	814	23.5	+1.8
Liberal Democrats	Clare Cassidy	458	13.2	+13.2
Green	David Finch	78	2.2	+2.2
Majority		433	12.5	−0.7
Turnout		3,467	66.8	+26.8
Conservative gain from Health Concern		Swing		

Lickhill
Party	Candidate	Votes	%	±%
Health Concern	Dixon Sheppard	1,517	42.0	−7.6
Conservative	Michael Freeman	1,420	39.3	−0.6
Labour	Jennifer Knowles	676	18.7	+8.2
Majority		97	2.7	−7.0
Turnout		3,613	66.2	+32.2
Health Concern hold		Swing		

Mitton
Party	Candidate	Votes	%	±%
Conservative	Michael Salter	1,802	46.0	−0.2
Health Concern	Clifford Brewer	1,402	35.8	−2.8
Labour	Gary Watson	717	18.3	+6.8
Majority		400	10.2	+2.6
Turnout		3,921	67.4	+33.4
Conservative hold		Swing		

Offmore and Comberton
Party	Candidate	Votes	%	±%
Liberal	Rosemary Bishop	1,649	45.2	−6.7
Conservative	Christopher Rogers	1,046	28.7	+1.2
Labour	Matthew Nicholls	489	13.4	+5.0
Health Concern	Raymond Barber	465	12.7	+0.5
Majority		603	16.5	−7.9
Turnout		3,649	68.3	+31.3
Liberal hold		Swing		

Oldington and Foley Park
Party	Candidate	Votes	%	±%
Conservative	Nichola Gale	584	33.4	−17.0
Labour	Dan Watson	415	23.7	+10.0
Liberal Democrats	Adrian Beavis	378	21.6	+6.6
Health Concern	Caroline Shellie	373	21.3	+0.5
Majority		169	9.7	−19.9
Turnout		1,750	47.5	+19.6
Conservative hold		Swing		

Sutton Park
Party	Candidate	Votes	%	±%
Conservative	John-Paul Campion	1,409	42.2	−17.4
Liberal Democrats	Samantha Walker	612	18.3	+9.3
Labour	David Prain	605	18.1	+8.8
Health Concern	John Griffiths	603	18.0	−4.1
Green	Michael Whitbread	112	3.4	+3.4
Majority		797	23.9	−13.6
Turnout		3,341	59.5	+25.5
Conservative hold		Swing		

Wribbenhall
Party	Candidate	Votes	%	±%
Conservative	Gordon Yarranton	1,257	44.6	−2.9
Health Concern	Linda Candlin	705	25.0	−4.8
Labour	Dean Cox	492	17.5	−1.5
Liberal Democrats	John Stephen	365	12.9	+12.9
Majority		552	19.6	+1.9
Turnout		2,819	71.2	+32.0
Conservative hold		Swing		
