= 2000 Wyre Forest District Council election =

2000 UK local government election

The 2000 Wyre Forest District Council election took place on 4 May 2000 to elect members of Wyre Forest District Council in Worcestershire, England. One third of the council was up for election and the council stayed under no overall control.

After the election, the composition of the council was:

- Health Concern 19
- Labour 11
- Conservative 5
- Liberal Democrats 4
- Liberal 3

== Background ==
Before the election the council had 17 Labour, 7 Health Concern, 5 Conservative, 5 independent, 4 Liberal Democrats and 3 Liberal councillors, with one seat vacant. The council was run by an alliance of all groups apart from Labour.

57 candidates stood in the election with 15 seats being contested, which included 2 seats in Greenhill ward due to a by-election being held at the same time.

== Election result ==
Health Concern became the largest group on the council after making 8 gains and Health Concern was also boosted by the decision of 3 independent councillors to join the group. Labour losses included the deputy leader of the party and the longest-serving member of the council, Michael Kelly, in Habberley and Blakebrook ward. The only other group to make a gain in the election was the Conservatives in Oldington and Foley Park ward where they took a seat from Labour.

The defeats for Labour were put down to the downgrading of Kidderminster hospital, despite the local party opposing the move. Labour said that the results would be a disaster as they said Health Concern had no policies in many areas. However Health Concern put their success down to disillusionment with political parties that had failed to take action over the hospital and that they would represent local opinion.

Following the election the Health Concern group said they wanted to continue the alliance with the other groups apart from Labour.

Wyre Forest local election result 2000
Party	Seats	Gains	Losses	Net gain/loss	Seats %	Votes %	Votes	+/−
Health Concern	8			+8	53.3			
Independent	3			-2	20.0			
Labour	1			-7	6.7			
Conservative	1			0	6.7			
Liberal Democrats	1			0	6.7			
Liberal	1			0	6.7			
