= 2003 Wyre Forest District Council election =

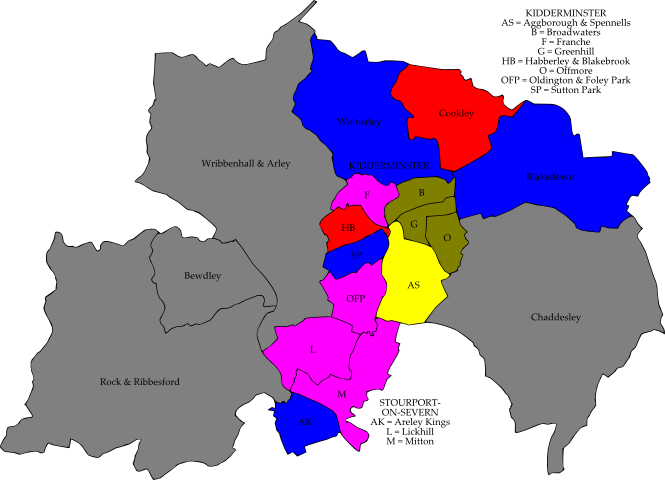
Map of the results of the 2003 Wyre Forest District Council election. Conservatives in blue, Health Concern in pink, Liberal in olive, Labour in red and Liberal Democrats in yellow. Wards in grey were not contested in 2003.

The 2003 Wyre Forest District Council election took place on 1 May 2003 to elect members of Wyre Forest District Council in Worcestershire, England. One third of the council was up for election and the council stayed under no overall control.

After the election, the composition of the council was:

- Health Concern 19
- Conservative 9
- Liberal 7
- Labour 4
- Liberal Democrats 2
- Independent 1

== Background ==
Before the election the council was composed of 21 Health Concern, 7 Conservative, 5 Labour, 5 Liberal, 2 Liberal Democrats and 2 independent councillors. 15 seats were up for election with Health Concern needing to gain one seat to win a majority but the other parties predicted they could make gains instead. The seats being defended in the election were 6 Health Concern, 3 Conservative, 3 Labour, 1 Liberal, 1 Liberal Democrat and 1 independent, which included 2 seats in Oldington and Foley Park ward where a Conservative councillor had stood down.

== Election result ==
Health Concern suffered a net loss of 2 councillors after losing 3 seats and only gaining 1 in Oldington and Foley Park. Despite the losses Health Concern said that it would continue as a minority administration on the council. The Conservatives strengthened their position as the main opposition on the council after increasing their number of seats to 9 including a shock gain from Labour in Wolverley. They put their gains down to a focus on "community issues" including crime, tax and health and disillusionment with Health Concern.

Meanwhile, Labour dropped to only holding 4 seats, their lowest number of seats on the council since the late 1970s and their joint lowest ever. Other changes included 2 gains for the Liberals in Broadwaters and Habberley and Blakebrook, while the Liberal Democrats lost 1 seat but gained another in Aggborough and Spennells.

Voter turnout in the election was down to below 31%, the lowest since 1998, with only 2 wards seeing a turnout of over 35%. This was attributed to the lack of strong issues during the campaign compared to previous elections where controversy over Kidderminster hospital and a planned incinerator increased interest.

Wyre Forest local election result 2003
Party	Seats	Gains	Losses	Net gain/loss	Seats %	Votes %	Votes	+/−
Conservative	5	3	1	+2	33.3	27.1	5,447	+2.0%
Health Concern	4	1	3	-2	26.7	27.0	5,416	-2.6%
Liberal	3	2	0	+2	20.0	12.7	2,542	-0.3%
Labour	2	1	2	-1	13.3	24.1	4,849	-0.7%
Liberal Democrats	1	1	1	0	6.7	8.8	1,768	+2.5%
Independent	0	0	1	-1	0	0.4	72	-0.7%

== Ward results ==
Aggborough and Spennells
Party	Candidate	Votes	%	±%
Liberal Democrats	Peter Dyke	902	42.1	+10.9
Health Concern	Jacqueline Cotterill	613	28.6	−5.6
Conservative	Douglas Godwin	453	21.2	−3.4
Labour	Lesley Brown	173	8.1	+1.3
Majority		289	13.5	
Turnout		2,141	30.3	
Liberal Democrats gain from Health Concern		Swing		

Areley Kings
Party	Candidate	Votes	%	±%
Conservative	Maureen Mason	587	37.1	−1.5
Health Concern	Nigel Thomas	478	30.2	+30.2
Labour	James Cooper	467	29.5	−17.1
Liberal Democrats	Paul Simpson	52	3.3	+3.3
Majority		109	6.9	
Turnout		1,584	34.4	
Conservative gain from Labour		Swing		

Blakedown
Party	Candidate	Votes	%	±%
Conservative	Pauline Hayward	427	82.6	
Labour	Trevor Bennett	90	17.4	
Majority		337	65.2	
Turnout		517	34.0	
Conservative hold		Swing		

Broadwaters
Party	Candidate	Votes	%	±%
Liberal	Robert Wheway	583	45.2	+30.3
Health Concern	Michael Shellie	328	25.4	−21.2
Labour	David Montague-Smith	199	15.4	−8.7
Conservative	James Musk	108	8.4	−1.1
Independent	David Gourley	72	5.6	+5.6
Majority		255	19.8	
Turnout		1,290	26.7	
Liberal gain from Independent		Swing		

Cookley
Party	Candidate	Votes	%	±%
Labour	Christopher Nicholls	396	61.2	
Conservative	David Pittaway	251	38.8	
Majority		145	22.4	
Turnout		647	35.2	
Labour hold		Swing		

Franche
Party	Candidate	Votes	%	±%
Health Concern	Leonard Barton	681	41.1	−7.0
Labour	Nigel Knowles	552	33.3	+1.1
Conservative	Jeffrey Baker	423	25.5	+8.0
Majority		129	7.8	−8.1
Turnout		1,656	29.2	
Health Concern hold		Swing		

Greenhill
Party	Candidate	Votes	%	±%
Liberal	Graham Ballinger	873	55.9	−1.3
Health Concern	Jane Paterson	336	21.5	−0.2
Labour	Geoffrey Morgan	205	13.1	−0.2
Conservative	Geoffrey Bulmer	147	9.4	+1.6
Majority		537	34.4	−1.1
Turnout		1,561	29.9	
Liberal gain from Health Concern		Swing		

Habberley and Blakebrook
Party	Candidate	Votes	%	±%
Labour	Lynn Hyde	796	44.4	+10.8
Health Concern	John Clarke	694	38.7	−14.4
Conservative	Neil Anderson	233	13.0	+1.7
Liberal Democrats	Nigel Bryan	70	3.9	+1.9
Majority		102	5.7	
Turnout		1,793	35.5	
Labour gain from Health Concern		Swing		

Lickhill
Party	Candidate	Votes	%	±%
Health Concern	Brian Glass	854	52.9	−0.3
Conservative	David Little	460	28.5	+1.7
Labour	Donovan Giles	300	18.6	−1.4
Majority		394	24.4	−2.0
Turnout		1,614	29.1	
Health Concern hold		Swing		

Mitton
Party	Candidate	Votes	%	±%
Health Concern	Patricia Rimell	585	44.6	+0.1
Conservative	Michael Freeman	399	30.4	−1.3
Labour	Gary Watson	233	17.7	−6.1
Liberal Democrats	Nigel Tackley-Goodman	96	7.3	+7.3
Majority		186	14.2	+1.4
Turnout		1,313	25.8	
Health Concern hold		Swing		

Offmore
Party	Candidate	Votes	%	±%
Liberal	Frances Oborski	1,086	68.5	−5.7
Labour	Keith Budden	285	18.0	+4.8
Conservative	Margaret Gregory	215	13.6	+1.0
Majority		801	50.5	−10.5
Turnout		1,586	34.4	
Liberal hold		Swing		

Oldington and Foley Park (2 seats)
Party	Candidate	Votes	%	±%
Health Concern	Anne Mace	361		
Conservative	Susan Meekings	340		
Labour	James Brown	324		
Labour	John Gretton	322		
Conservative	William Jones	302		
Liberal Democrats	Pamela Dixon	238		
Liberal Democrats	Michael Price	180		
Turnout		2,067	25.7	
Health Concern gain from Conservative		Swing		
Conservative hold		Swing		

Sutton Park
Party	Candidate	Votes	%	±%
Conservative	James Dudley	751	51.0	
Health Concern	Peter Young	295	20.0	
Liberal Democrats	Stanley Ratcliff	230	15.6	
Labour	William Bradley	197	13.4	
Majority		456	31.0	
Turnout		1,473	30.9	
Conservative gain from Liberal Democrats		Swing		

Wolverley
Party	Candidate	Votes	%	±%
Conservative	Nigel Addison	351	41.2	
Labour	John Wardle	310	36.4	
Health Concern	Frank Baillie	191	22.4	
Majority		41	4.8	
Turnout		852	49.6	
Conservative gain from Labour		Swing		
