= Independent Community & Health Concern =

Former UK political party

Independent Health Concern
- Leader: Harry Grove
- President: Richard Taylor
- Founded: 1995
- Dissolved: 9 November 2023
- Succeeded by: National Health Action
- Headquarters: 10 Swallow Drive, Kidderminster, DY10 4DG
- Ideology: Single-issue politics

Website
- http://www.healthconcern.org.uk/

Independent Community and Health Concern (formerly Independent Kidderminster Hospital and Health Concern, and commonly referred to as Health Concern), abbr. ICHC, was a single-issue political party in the United Kingdom, based in the town of Kidderminster. The party was founded out of support to restore the casualty unit at Kidderminster Hospital, and is best known for the success of its leader, Dr. Richard Taylor, who served Member of Parliament (MP) for Wyre Forest between 2001 and 2010. The party briefly held control of Wyre Forest District Council in 2002, on which three of its councillors have served as council leader.

== History ==
=== Background ===
In 1997, Worcestershire health authority announced reforms to help reduce its multi-million pound budget deficit. This included downgrading Kidderminster Hospital to a minor injuries unit, which led to opposition from local campaign group, Independent Kidderminster Hospital and Health Concern, which had raised a 100,000 signature petition, led a protest march and lobbied the Prime Minister. The plans went ahead in September 2000, leading to the closure of the Accident and Emergency (A&E) department, alongside other in-patient services.

In early 1999, the group claimed to have 100,000 supporters and contested seats on Wyre Forest District Council in protest against the attempts to downgrade the hospital. The following year, Health Concern formed the largest council bloc with 19 councillors.

=== Richard Taylor ===
By March 2001, Health Concern had announced that their leader, Richard Taylor, a retired consultant who worked at the hospital for 23 years, would be standing in the Wyre Forest constituency at the 2001 general election. The area's incumbent Labour MP, David Lock, who had previously accused the Health Concern of scaremongering, said the election was "not going to be a referendum on Kidderminster hospital". Taylor won the seat with more than 28,000 votes at a surprise landslide victory, although he benefited from a decision by the Liberal Democrats not to put up a candidate of their own. He was the only person not from a major party elected as an MP from an English constituency in the 2001 Parliament.

Taylor was re-elected as member for Wyre Forest in the 2005 election, albeit with a considerably reduced majority. The party lost the seat in the 2010 election to the Conservative candidate, Mark Garnier, by a margin of 2,643 votes; the Liberal Democrats did field a candidate in 2010 having not done so in 2001 and 2005, which may have contributed to Taylor's defeat. Taylor was appointed an MBE in the Queen's Birthday Honours List in 2014, for services to Worcestershire, particularly Kidderminster Hospital.

Taylor went on to co-found the National Health Action Party, which encouraged doctors and other medical professionals to stand for parliament. He continued to serve as the President of Health Concern, which he stood for again in Wyre Forest at the 2015 general election, placing fourth.

=== Local government ===
Before the 2004 local elections Health Concern held 16 seats on Wyre Forest District Council, making it the largest party, but in those elections it lost half of these seats to the Conservative Party. By 2008, the party held 19 seats on the district council. In the 2000s, the party had councillors on Worcester City Council and Redditch Borough Council, and also held the Cleobury Mortimer ward on Shropshire Council for eight years.

=== Dissolution and legacy ===
In May 2022, Taylor announced that Independent Health Concern, which had eight councillors on Wyre Forest District Council, would withdraw from standing candidates in future elections, to "unify the independent vote". The party was statutorily de-registered by the Electoral Commission the following year.

Six former representatives stood in the 2023 Wyre Forest District Council election, of which two were elected, Peter Young and Nicola Martin.

== Electoral history ==
=== Parliamentary elections ===
Health Concern's candidate Richard Taylor stood for the fourth time in Wyre Forest at the 2015 general election.

Election year	Candidate	Votes	%	Position	Result
2001	Richard Taylor	28,487	58.1	1st	Elected
2005	Richard Taylor	18,739	39.9	1st	Elected
2010	Richard Taylor	16,150	32.7	2nd	Not elected
2015	Richard Taylor	7,211	14.6	4th	Not elected

=== Local elections ===
The party was fielded candidates at every election in Wyre Forest between 1999 and 2019.

Wyre Forest District Council
Election year	Seats won	Votes	Total seats	Council control
1999	7	—	7	No overall control
2000	8	—	19	No overall control
2002	7	6,343	21	Health Concern
2003	4	5,416	19	No overall control
2004	8	8,919	—	No overall control
2006	5	8,362	9	No overall control
2007	4	7,327	10	No overall control
2008	1	6,100	10	Conservative
2010	3	11,517	8	Conservative
2011	1	5,825	4	Conservative
2012	5	6,640	8	No overall control
2014	1	5,344	7	No overall control
2015	2	14,361	2	Conservative
2016	1	3,711	3	Conservative
2018	0	1,921	2	Conservative
2019	8	9,763	8	No overall control

The party held one seat in Shropshire between 2009 and 2017.

Shropshire County Council
Election Year	Ward / Division	Candidate	Party	Votes	Result
2009	Cleobury Mortimer	Madge Shineton	Health Concern	1,454	Elected
2013	Cleobury Mortimer	Madge Shineton	Health Concern	1,181	Elected
2017	Cleobury Mortimer	Madge Shineton	Health Concern	1,311	Elected

== See also ==
- National Health Action Party
- Kidderminster Hospital
