= Spennells =

Coordinates: 52.371°N 2.231°W

Spennells is a suburb of Kidderminster, Worcestershire about a mile south of the town centre. It is located just to the east of the A449 and the railway line between Worcester and Kidderminster. There is a lake (known as Captain's Pool) and Kidderminster Golf Club is just to the north. The Spennells Valley nature reserve is nearby.

Many of the streets on the major housing estate are named after birds. The area has several shops including a supermarket, a pharmacy, a florist, a hairdresser, a hospice shop, and two takeaway restaurants. Spennells has a primary school, Heronswood Primary School (Spennells Community Primary School).
