= Consensual crime =

Crime to which all parties consent

A consensual crime is a public-order crime that involves more than one participant, all of whom give their consent as willing participants in an activity that is unlawful. Legislative bodies and interest groups sometimes rationalize the criminalization of consensual activity because they feel it offends cultural norms, or because one of the parties to the activity is considered a "victim" despite their informed consent.

Consensual crimes can be described as crimes in which the victim is the state, the judicial system, or society at large and so affect the general (sometimes ideological or cultural) interests of the system, such as common sexual morality. Victimless crimes, while similar, typically involve acts that do not involve multiple persons. Drug use is typically considered a victimless crime whereas the sale of drugs between two or more persons would be a consensual crime. The fact that no persons come forward to claim injury has essentially made the two terms interchangeable in common use.

== Giving consent ==
When discussing consensual crime, one issue is whether all the participants are capable of giving genuine legal consent. This may not be the case if one or more of the participants are:

- Animals
- Children (normally measured as being under the legal age of consent)
- Severely disabled
- Severely mentally ill
- Not fully informed about the issues involved
- Suffering from mood swings
- Acting under duress
- Addicted
- Intoxicated
- Unconscious

== Examples ==
The generally accepted definition of a consensual crime is a criminal act committed by two or more people, who consent to involvement, and does not involve any nonconsenting individuals. The following is a list of criminal acts in various societies at various times and in different societies, where the issue of liability hinges on consent or the lack of it:

- Unlicensed prize fights and other criminal activities of a sporting nature where the players consent and the audience actively approves of what they see (in English law, see R v Coney).
- Murder or incitement to murder where one person actively solicits others to terminate their life, or the life of another. For example, a driver may be trapped in a burning tanker full of gasoline and beg a passing armed police officer to shoot him rather than let him burn to death. These situations are distinguishable from soliciting the cessation of life-sustaining treatment so that the injured person may die a natural death, or leaving instructions not to resuscitate in the event of death. Note that, in English law under the Suicide Act 1961, suicide is not a crime committed by a person who fails to die. Thus, those who assist in a suicide attempt would be participants in a victimless crime because the would-be suicide cannot be tried. If the suicide succeeds, the legal issue is whether the assistants actively facilitated the death, or as doctors, nurses or carers, omitted to prevent natural death in circumstances where society believes they have no legal duty to take that preventive action. Some countries have characterised some of the possible situations as assisted suicide, while others make no judgment by imposing a separate label on conduct within the field of homicide. The issues may more generally relate to euthanasia where society debates whether, and in what circumstances, to terminate the lives of its citizens. Whichever philosophical route is followed, the laws will either criminalize any situation in which death results or permit death to be caused under controlled circumstances.
- Sexual and non-sexual assaults involving the use or threatened use of violence which causes injuries and which would be criminal in all other situations (e.g. sadism and masochism). In cases of consensual nonconsent where a rape fantasy may be enacted by prior agreement, the offence of rape will not be committed because the "victim" has actually consented to sexual intercourse. The issue of consent in fact, or belief in the existence of consent, is fundamental to determining whether a rape has, or has not, been committed. In English law, for example, s. 74 Sexual Offences Act 2003 provides that consent is present "if he agrees by choice, and has the freedom and capacity to make that choice". If the "victim" is unconscious when penetration occurs, he would not be consenting, but this might not be rape if there is a subsisting sexual relationship, e.g. an agreement of consent for this scenario has been agreed upon by all parties beforehand. Note that, if the "victim" is physically injured, the causing of those injuries can still be charged as an assault whether there is actual consent or not. As a defense, offenders may plead that the other consented to the acts, and argue that any injuries sustained were accidental rather than intentional, leaving it to the jury to make a decision on their truthfulness.
  - See more fully the discussion in Dennis J. Baker, The Right Not to be Criminalized: Demarcating Criminal Law's Authority (Ashgate, 2011) where Dr Baker argues (in chapter 5) that there is a limit to consensual harm doing—but that the threshold of harm has to be reasonably high. Baker also asserts that it is only the harm-doer who should be criminalized; not the harm-receiver. He also points out there is a difference between risking harm to others (as those who engage in casual sex do when they know that there is a chance they might have HIV), and deliberately exposing another to the risk of HIV, for example, where a person has been told he or she is a carrier and fails to inform his or her sexual partner.
- Pornography, which can be illegal to produce, distribute or possess in some countries, even if the participants consented to the acts, and the acts themselves are legal (see List of pornography laws by country).
- Censorship laws, such as obscenity laws, may criminalise distribution of material even if it is only viewed by those who consent to viewing it.
- Statutory rape where the underage participant(s) give actual consent, but the law-makers of the relevant jurisdiction have determined that people of that age are not legally capable of giving informed consent (not informed adequately about the activity).
- Criminal transmission of HIV through consensual sexual activity.
- Adultery and, in general, sex outside marriage or other established relationships where all persons immediately involved give consent.

== See also ==
- People v. Jovanovic – Criminal case in New York
- Operation Spanner – 1980s UK police investigation into same-sex male sadomasochism
- Consensual homicide
