= Killing of Natalie Connolly =

2016 death in the UK

Natalie Connolly died on 18 December 2016 due to a violent assault. Her partner, John Broadhurst, pleaded guilty to manslaughter. Broadhurst claimed that she consented to the 40 injuries she sustained in his "rough sex" defence. His failure to call upon emergency services to treat her injuries resulted in her bleeding to death.

The injuries inflicted upon Connolly included "lacerations to her vagina resulting in arterial and venous haemorrhage" from the insertion of a bottle of carpet cleaner, bruises from Broadhurst beating her with his hand and a suede boot, a "blowout fracture to her left orbit", injuries to her breasts, alongside many others.

== Trial ==
When the trial commenced at the Crown Court at Birmingham in November 2018, Broadhurst was accused of murdering and causing grievous bodily harm "with intent" to Connolly, who was 26 when she died. Broadhurst said that Connolly had consented to "rough sex" and that, after a pause during a sex game, he later found her at the bottom of the stairs and left her there while he went to bed and slept. The prosecution QC told the court, "Whatever may have started willingly, there is no way that Natalie either consented or was able to consent to what John Broadhurst did to her after that, leading to her untimely, unseemly and tragic death."

During the trial, the prosecution changed the charge to manslaughter by gross negligence to achieve a "realistic prospect of conviction". The prosecution QC explained the decision to accept Broadhurst's plea to a lesser charge, telling the court, "The evidence in this case, which is an extremely unusual case, has been very complicated."

The judge, Mr Justice Julian Knowles, held Broadhurst guilty of manslaughter by gross negligence after he pleaded guilty (to manslaughter) halfway through the trial. He sentenced Broadhurst to three years and eight months in prison.

The defence which Broadhurst relied upon during his trial was ultimately the "rough sex" murder defence which argues that Connolly consented to the injuries he inflicted upon her during "consensual sexual activity". It was accepted that the beatings by hand and boot made by Broadhurst had been consented to by Connolly. It was also accepted that some injuries would have been caused accidentally by herself due to her high intoxication levels.

In November 2019, Broadhurst's bid for a reduced sentence was rejected at the Court of Appeal. Three senior judges considered the appeal, and Lord Justice Holroyde said they were "unable to accept" that Broadhurst's "gross negligence was of brief duration" and that his appeal "ignored his own role in Ms Connolly's injuries and intoxicated state".

Broadhurst was released from prison after serving 22 months.

== Response ==
The case has been very controversial and has been subject to much criticism. In December 2018, Fiona Mackenzie founded the We Can't Consent To This campaign after discovering the case of Connolly. Her aim behind the campaign is to raise awareness surrounding the issues of violence during sexual intercourse whilst also campaigning to abolish any successful attempts of the "rough sex" defence. In an interview, Mackenzie was astonished to hear that despite many disapproving of the verdict, there were several others accepting it as they "somehow believed it, saw it as a weird one-off and thought the victim must be to blame for the riskiness of her behaviour".

Connolly's MP Mark Garnier, alongside MP Harriet Harman have since taken action to resolve the issues of the "rough sex" defence by advocating amendments to the Domestic Abuse Bill in England and Wales. Although there is case law that prevents a defence of consent whereby the injuries are serious, they believe this is not enough. According to them, the Domestic Abuse Bill is important as it will be "under the noses of the Crown Prosecution service and judges".

On 6 July 2020, MPs voted in favour of the Domestic Abuse Bill, which included a provision against the "rough sex" murder defence.

== The law ==
At the time of Broadhurst's trial, the law in the United Kingdom on consent to masochism during sexual intercourse derived from the decisions of R v Brown where it was held that a defendant cannot rely upon the consent of its victim where he has caused actual or grievous bodily harm.

Since then, The Domestic Abuse Bill has brought the R v Brown case law into statute and the introduction of a Director of Public Prosecutions review in cases of domestic killing when prosecutors suggest a lesser crime of manslaughter. The Domestic Abuse Bill received Royal Assent on 29 April 2021, becoming the Domestic Abuse Act 2021.
