= Operation Spanner =

1980s UK police investigation into same-sex male sadomasochism

OutRage! protesters picket the Old Bailey following the Spanner trial, December 1990

Operation Spanner was a late-1980s police investigation in the United Kingdom into consensual same-sex sadomasochistic practices. The Metropolitan Police Obscene Publications Squad conducted the inquiry from 1987 to 1990, questioning about 100 gay and bisexual men.

The investigation produced a report naming 43 individuals. The Director of Public Prosecutions charged 16 men with assault occasioning actual bodily harm, unlawful wounding, and related offences for consensual acts in private between 1978 and 1987.

The prosecutions culminated in the House of Lords case R v Brown, which established that consent is not a valid defence for actual bodily harm. The case prompted public and legal debate about the limits of consent and the extent of the state's authority over private sexual behaviour.

== Background ==
Before the Operation Spanner investigation, British law enforcement and politics were influenced by shifting attitudes toward homosexuality, the spread of HIV/AIDS, and police campaigns against obscenity.

=== Public attitudes on homosexuality ===
Public attitudes toward homosexuality in Britain became more negative during the 1980s. In 1987, the British Social Attitudes Survey found that three-quarters of respondents said same-sex activity was always or mostly wrong. That same year, the government's HIV/AIDS campaign Don't Die of Ignorance delivered information leaflets to every household. Linking gay and bisexual men with the AIDS pandemic increased social stigma.

Conservative Party campaign poster criticising Labour's support for LGBT education, 1987

During the 1987 United Kingdom general election, the Conservative Party under Margaret Thatcher campaigned against what it described as the promotion of homosexuality in schools. Party posters accused the Labour Party of supporting books such as Young, Gay and Proud. At the party conference, Thatcher said that children were being taught "that they have an inalienable right to be gay".

=== Law and policing ===
In 1988, Section 28 of the Local Government Act barred local authorities from "intentionally promoting homosexuality". Many Conservative MPs supported the measure. Peter Bruinvels said it would help outlaw homosexuality. Later proposals sought to block LGBT adoption and to increase penalties for cruising, the practice of meeting partners for sex in public places.

Although sex between men had been partly decriminalised in 1967, the offence of gross indecency continued to be used to prosecute consensual sex between men. In 1989, police recorded more than 2,000 such offences—the highest number since decriminalisation. Around 30 percent of convictions for sexual offences that year involved consensual gay sex.

=== Obscenity policing ===
The Obscene Publications Squad of the Metropolitan Police enforced the Obscene Publications Act 1959, which prohibited material considered likely to "deprave and corrupt".

From the mid-1970s to the late 1980s, the squad's activities changed significantly. A 1976 inquiry found that officers had accepted bribes from the Soho sex industry for about 20 years. Detective Superintendent William Moody reportedly received about £25,000 annually. Thirteen officers were jailed for corruption, and the unit became known as "the Dirty Squad". After the scandal, officers were limited to short postings to reduce corruption.

In the 1980s, the squad worked with the National Viewers and Listeners Association and its founder Mary Whitehouse, whose campaigns opposed pornography. Officers also took part in the video nasty campaign, seizing horror films such as Evil Dead II and The Driller Killer, along with gay pornography. Critics said the squad acted on moral rather than legal grounds, and the Lesbian and Gay Policing Association stated that its actions harmed relations between police and the LGBT community.

== Investigation ==
In October 1987, the Greater Manchester Police obtained a videotape, codenamed KL7, that depicted consensual sadomasochistic activity between men. Police began trying to identify those involved.

=== Early raids and expansion ===
In early November 1987, police searched homes in Bolton, Shrewsbury, and other parts of Shropshire. They said, without evidence, that someone might have been killed during filming.

Further tapes showing acts such as whipping, spanking, and wax play were later found. The inquiry expanded to include sixteen police forces, including West Mercia Police and West Yorkshire Police. The Obscene Publications Squad of the Metropolitan Police was assigned to lead the case, now called Operation Spanner.

=== Media coverage and public reaction ===
Later in November, gay magazines reported on the raids. A man interviewed by Him magazine said police had mentioned snuff films during questioning. Greater Manchester Police denied any connection to snuff films but wrongly suggested the case might be linked to a 1985 murder in Leeds. Those questioned said they had met through personal ads in gay magazines and sometimes recorded their activities on video. Most cooperated and identified themselves on the seized tapes, telling police that everything shown was consensual.

=== Identification of participants (1988) ===
By early 1988, police still did not know who appeared on the KL7 tape, though they had already interviewed the man who filmed it. Investigators circulated a still image showing a distinctive joint deformity on one man's left index finger. On 29 March 1988, an officer in Hampshire recognised the man in a Panorama episode showing a same-sex blessing by a Church of England vicar. The joint deformity was visible in a close-up shot. Police interviewed him on 7 April and searched his home. He identified another participant, who was later questioned at his home in Broadway.

A still from Panorama used by police to identify a participant

=== Continued investigation and charges (1989) ===
By 1989, police had collected hundreds of tapes and witness statements. They seized more than 400 tapes, many of which were commercial or not pornographic. The investigation cost about £2.5 million. Police found no evidence of non-consensual acts or lasting injuries. In September 1989, sixteen men were charged with more than 100 offences, including assault causing bodily harm (legally termed "assault occasioning actual bodily harm") and unlawful wounding. Some were accused of aiding and abetting assaults against themselves, a charge prosecutors said was rare outside insurance fraud cases. One man faced a charge of bestiality, and two were charged over an indecent photograph of a child.

=== Later administrative actions ===
In 1991, while the case was ongoing, the Metropolitan Police replaced Detective Superintendent Leslie Bennett after he was found to have misused the Police National Computer.

== Trials ==
=== Magistrates' Court ===
On 9 October 1989, the defendants appeared in Camberwell Magistrates' Court on charges related to Operation Spanner. They were ordered to return to Lambeth Magistrates' Court on 20 November.

They were accused of conspiracy, a charge that could only be heard in the Crown Court. Magistrates referred the case to the Old Bailey for trial the following year.

=== Old Bailey ===
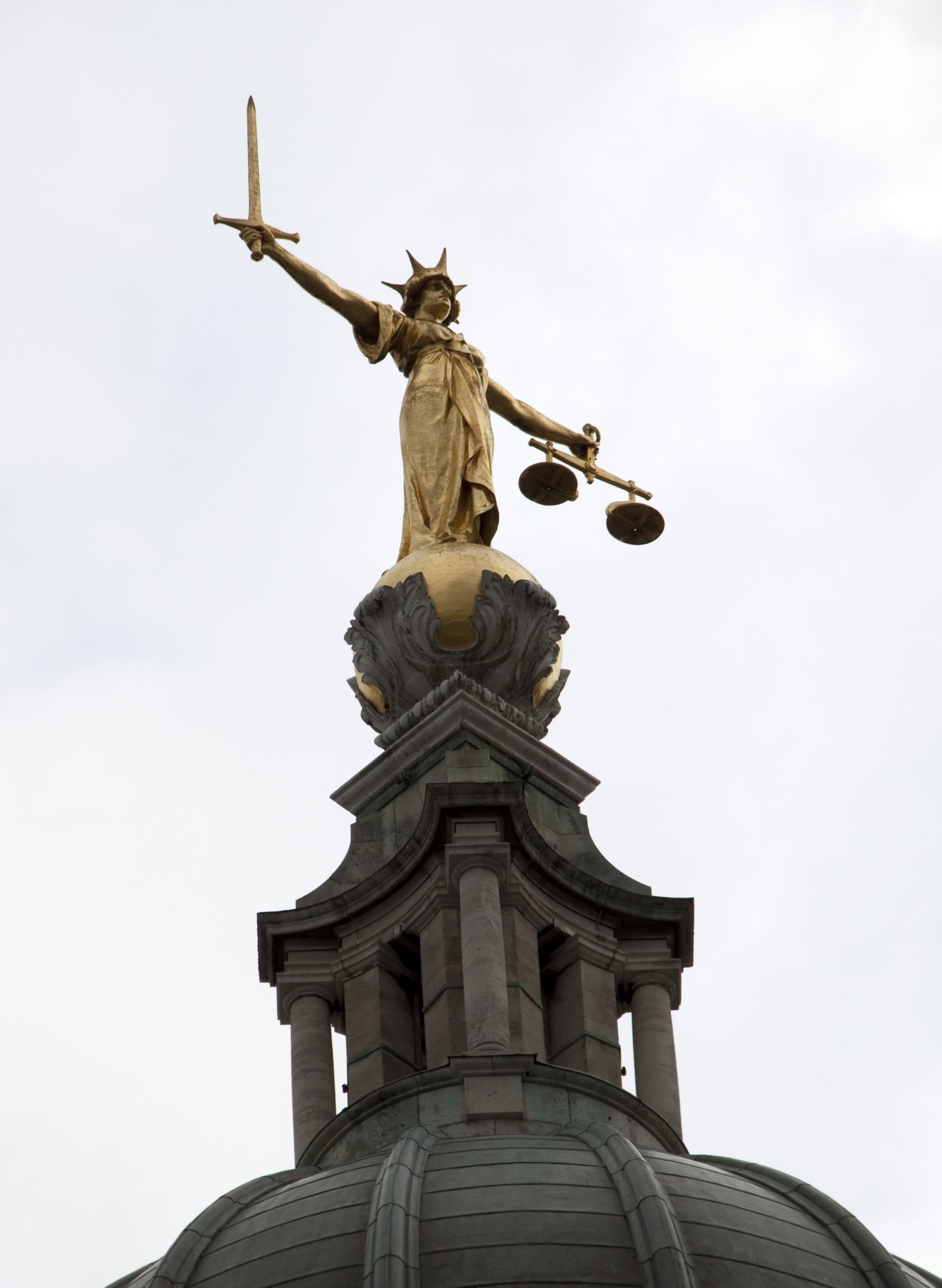
Statue of Lady Justice atop the Old Bailey

The trial began on 29 October 1990 before Judge James Rant. The defendants said everyone involved had consented. Rant ruled that consent was not a defence and said, "People must sometimes be protected from themselves".

He referred to R v Coney (1882), where boxers were convicted despite mutual consent, and R v Donovan (1934), where a man was convicted for caning a consenting woman. The defendants then changed their pleas and were convicted on 7 November.

==== Sentencing ====
Before sentencing, Detective Superintendent Michael Hames of the Obscene Publications Squad wrote in the Daily Mail that the men formed "the most horrific porn ring ever before a British court". The National Campaign for the Reform of the Obscene Publications Acts called the article "heavily propagandist".

On 19 December 1990, Rant sentenced eight men to between one and four and a half years in prison. Prosecutor Michael Worsley QC described the acts as "brute homosexual activity in sinister circumstances, about as far removed as can be imagined from the concept of human love". He said the evidence came from statements and private home videos that were not intended for distribution.

In sentencing, Rant said: Much has been said about individual liberty and the rights people have to do what they want with their own bodies, but the courts must draw the line between what is acceptable in a civilised society and what is not. In this case, the practices clearly lie on the wrong side of that line.

==== Media coverage ====
Press coverage echoed Worsley's remarks, with The Daily Telegraph calling the group a "torture vice gang" and The Times describing them as "leaders of [a] vicious and perverted sex gang".

Defence lawyers said all participants had consented, were over the age of consent, and had not needed medical treatment. Anna Worrall QC objected to the mention of some defendants' HIV status and the use of police dogs during raids. She warned that such details could worsen stigma, which several newspapers later repeated.

Rant appeared distressed while watching the videotapes and asked for a break. He later said, "I am not likely to have forgotten that film". As the men left the court, one defendant was injured after being knocked down and kicked by photographers.

After the trial, the dropped conspiracy charges led to claims that the government had sought a test case to define the legal limits of consent.

=== Court of Appeal ===
After the Old Bailey convictions, five men appealed to the Court of Appeal in February 1992. The Lord Chief Justice, Lord Lane, upheld the convictions, saying consent was "immaterial". The defendants argued that consensual acts should not count as assault, but the judges rejected this view. Lane said the men had not realised their actions were illegal and reduced the longest sentence to six months. He granted a further appeal to the House of Lords, saying the case raised an important legal question about consent.

=== House of Lords ===
When the Court of Appeal upheld the convictions, the men appealed to the House of Lords. Ann Mallalieu QC argued that private acts between consenting adults should not be crimes unless they caused serious harm or involved unwilling participants. She said no one had complained to the police, no lasting injuries occurred, and all participation was voluntary.

The House of Lords rejected the appeal by a 3–2 majority. Lord Templeman wrote:

There is a difference between violence that happens by chance and violence inflicted for cruelty. [...] Society must protect itself against a cult of violence. Pleasure from inflicting pain is an evil thing. Cruelty is uncivilised.

=== European Court of Human Rights ===
Three defendants later appealed to the European Court of Human Rights in Strasbourg. They argued the convictions violated their right to privacy under Article 8 of the European Convention on Human Rights. The court upheld the law by a 9–0 vote, saying it was "necessary in a democratic society for the protection of health". The judges said each country could apply such laws based on its own social standards.

The European Court upheld the earlier British rulings, ending the case. It remains a key precedent about consent and criminal law.

== Reaction and aftermath ==
Public and organisational responses to the Operation Spanner trial followed soon after the verdict. The case drew criticism from rights groups, inspired protests, and led to the creation of several activist organisations that continued campaigning into the mid-1990s.

=== Immediate criticism (1990) ===
Civil rights groups said the trial represented an invasion of privacy and a misuse of state power. The Gay London Policing Group and Liberty described the sentences as "outrageous" and argued that privacy should be protected by law. Keir Starmer said judges had "imposed their morality on others" and were "too unrepresentative to do so fairly". The Pink Paper described the trial as a "homophobic show trial", arguing that it aimed to establish the illegality of sadomasochism among gay men.

=== Public protests (1991) ===
Demonstrations followed soon after the verdict. On 16 February 1991, about 5,000 people marched in London against the Spanner convictions and proposed Clause 25 of the Criminal Justice Bill, which would have increased penalties for cruising and cottaging. Two months later, thousands joined the Liberation '91 march in Manchester, calling for equal rights and repeal of anti-gay laws. The marches became part of broader nationwide activism on sexual rights.

=== Activism and visibility (1992–1993) ===
As protests continued, activists formed Countdown on Spanner to challenge the Court of Appeal ruling and argue that sadomasochism is a legitimate form of consensual sexual expression. The group began publishing the newsletter Spanner People and organised a demonstration urging Detective Superintendent Michael Hames, head of the Obscene Publications Squad, to resign.

Organisers of Countdown on Spanner lead the first SM Pride march, November 1992

Later that year, more than 700 participants joined the first SM Pride march in London. In the early 1990s, the campaign contributed to wider debates on sexual autonomy and police oversight.

Operation Spanner also prompted the creation of two advocacy groups—Countdown on Spanner and The Sexual Freedom Coalition—and an annual SM Pride March in Central London. In 1996, the group Countdown on Spanner received the Large Nonprofit Organization of the Year award at the Pantheon of Leather Awards.

=== Legal and policy responses (1994–1996) ===
In 1994, the Law Commission released Consent in the Criminal Law, proposing that sexual activity between consenting adults should be legal unless it caused serious injury. The proposal was not adopted, and the following year campaigners established the Spanner Trust to support the defendants, advocate for legal reform, and assist people facing discrimination for private sexual activity. In 1996, the group was given the Large Nonprofit Organization of the Year award by the Pantheon of Leather.

Contemporary government and judicial responses to the protests were limited, and no major policy change followed immediately after the case. By the mid-1990s, activism surrounding Operation Spanner had shifted from public protest to sustained efforts focused on privacy rights and changes to British law.

== See also ==
- Consensual crime
- Consent (criminal law)
- Victimless crime
