= We Can't Consent to This =

Awareness campaign about strangulation in sex

We Can't Consent to This is an anti-BDSM campaign group which successfully sought to integrate the R v Brown case into UK statute law, thereby abolishing the "rough sex" defence.

== Campaign ==
The campaign was founded by Fiona Mackenzie in December 2018 in response to the trial decision in the murder of Natalie Connolly, whereupon the perpetrator was able to rely upon the "rough sex" defence and receive a lesser sentence of manslaughter. This led Mackenzie and other volunteers to begin campaigning against the defence relied upon in trials relating to "rough sex" across the world, particularly the United Kingdom. The campaign is known for its petitions as well as discussions with Members of Parliament. Alongside advocating the abolishment of the defence, they are seeking to make Non Fatal Strangulation a specific offence under the Domestic Abuse Bill.

We Can't Consent to This made a written submission to UK Parliament providing evidence on the Domestic Abuse Bill and its amendments for the outlawing of the "rough sex" defence which they claim are "needed now".

== Research ==
The campaign has worked with various researchers to uncover the issues surrounding the "rough sex" defence. In June 2020, the organisation published research regarding the success in claims of "rough sex" within England and Wales' judicial system. In December 2020, they shared results from a research conducted by Bichard, Byrne, Saville & Coetzer on the damage which non-fatal strangulation causes. In their research, it was found that once a woman has been strangled, her chances of her subsequently being murdered rises by eight times.

== Response ==
Since the written submission to the UK Parliament regarding the amending of the Domestic Abuse Bill, Member of Parliament Harriet Harman has expressed her support towards the campaign and has called for a review of the cases involving the "rough sex" defence. In an interview with the BBC, Harman stated that "there's enough evidence of cases where [the Crown Prosecution Service] have taken as read the rough sex gone wrong defence and therefore not prosecuted." The Centre for Women's Justice has shown similar support to the calls for reviewing such cases.

In 2020, Justice Minister Naomi Long of Northern Ireland opened a consultation following the campaign, which aims to create a new law that prohibits the "rough sex" defence to circumstances involving ABH and more serious violence.

68,000 people have since joined the campaign to end the "rough sex" defence, including the women's magazine Grazia, and the internet forum Mumsnet.
