= Sexual ethics =

Study of ethical conduct in sexual behavior

Sexual ethics (also known as sex ethics or sexual morality) is a branch of philosophy that considers the ethics or morality of human sexual behavior. Sexual ethics seeks to understand, evaluate, and critique interpersonal relationships and sexual activities from social, cultural, and philosophical perspectives. Some people consider aspects of human sexuality such as gender identification and sexual orientation, as well as consent, sexual relations and procreation, as giving rise to issues of sexual ethics.

Historically, the prevailing notions of what is regarded as sexually ethical have been linked to religious teachings and philosophy. More recently, the sexual revolution challenged traditional ethical codes, and the feminist movement has emphasized personal choice and consent in sexual activities, especially for women.

== Terminology and philosophical context ==
The terms ethics and morality are often used interchangeably, but sometimes ethics is reserved for interpersonal interactions and morality is used to cover both interpersonal and inherent questions.

Different approaches to applied ethics hold different views on inherent morality, for example:

- Moral nihilism is the meta-ethical view that nothing is inherently right or wrong, and that all value judgments are either human constructs or meaningless.
- Moral relativism is the meta-ethical view that moral judgments are subjective. In some cases this is merely descriptive, in other cases this approach is normative – the idea that morality should be judged in the context of each culture's convictions and practices.
- Moral universalism is the meta-ethical view that moral judgments are objectively true or false, that everyone should behave according to the same set of normative ethics.

Many practical questions arise regarding human sexuality, such as whether sexual norms should be enforced by law, given social approval, or changed.

== Viewpoints and historical development ==
=== Religion ===
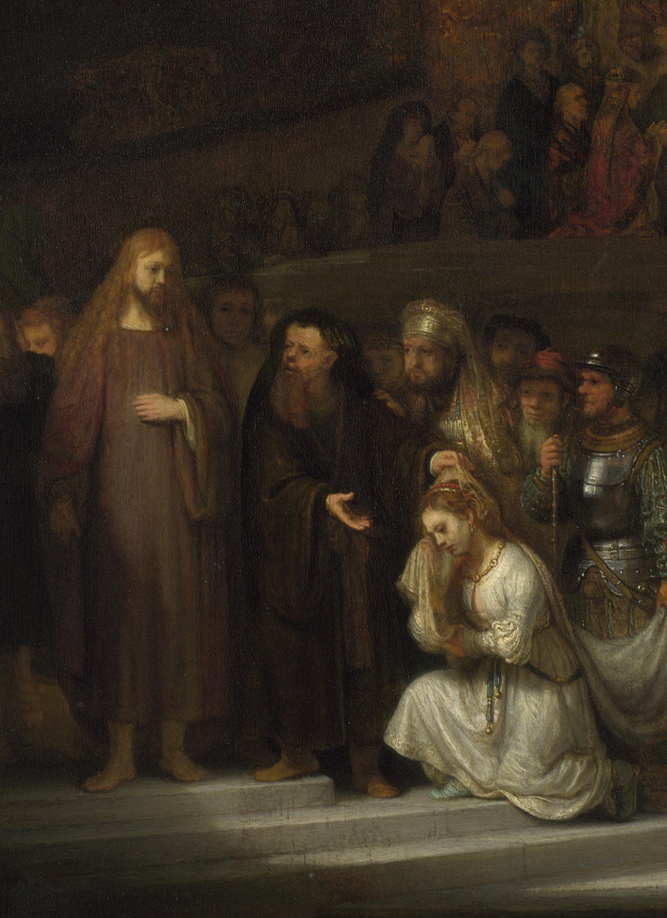
The Woman Taken in Adultery by Rembrandt depicts Jesus and the woman taken in adultery. Religion affects views on issues in sexual ethics, including adultery.

Morality and religion have historically been closely intertwined. Religious morality has usually looked down upon sex, with "...Christian philosophers condemn[ing] it".

==== Christianity ====
Christian denominations generally hold that sexual morality is defined by natural law, the Bible and tradition.

The unity of a couple in marriage and procreation are key factors in Christian sexual ethics, particularly in the teachings of the Catholic Church.

St. Thomas Aquinas and St. Augustine were some of the key figures in honing Christian ethics. Augustine underlined fidelity, offspring, and sacrament as the goods of sexual morality. Thomas Aquinas developed Augustine's thought to suggest that these ought to be understood as the three ends (telos) of marriage, and ranked them in order of importance, with procreation as the primary end.

=== Philosophy ===
Not until contemporary times has sex been thought of as something generally good in the history of western philosophy: "Plato denigrated it, arguing that it should lead to something higher or better (Phaedrus, Symposium), Aristotle barely mentioned it, and Christian philosophers condemned it." A major topic in the philosophy of sex and related to the question of the moral status of sex is objectification, where sexual objectification is treating a person only as a sex object. The concept originates in Kant's moral philosophy, and many modern thinkers have used it to criticize and analyze a wide range of ethical issues related to sex, such as pornography.

Kant views sex as only morally permissible in the context of a heterosexual, lifelong, and monogamous marriage, whereas any sexual act that is performed outside this context is considered morally wrong. This is due to Kant's interpretation of the Categorical Imperative with regard to sexual desire. He considers sex the only inclination that cannot satisfy the Categorical Imperative; in fact, sexual desire by its nature is objectifying and lends itself to the thing-like treatment of other persons.

The idea seems to be that sexual desire and pleasure cause very acute forms of sensation in a person's own body; that these sensations drive out, for a time, all other thoughts, including the thoughts of respect for humanity that are characteristic of the moral attitude to persons. ... In that condition of mind, one cannot manage to see the other person as anything but a tool of one's own interests, a set of bodily parts that are useful tools for one's pleasure, and the powerful urge to secure one's own sexual satisfaction will ensure that instrumentalization (and therefore denial of autonomy and of subjectivity) continues until the sexual act has reached its conclusion.

The solution to the overall problem of objectification and sex, on Kant's view, is marriage: Only marriage can make objectification tolerable. Kant argues that in a marriage, which is "a relationship that is structured institutionally in ways that promote and, at least legally if not morally, guarantee mutual respect and regard", objectification may be rendered harmless. Furthermore, not all sexual activity is necessarily objectifying here: sexual activity that does not involve sexual desire might treat another person as a mere thing and might thus not be objectifying. However, Kant does not distinguish between male and female sexuality, and his analysis does not consider social hierarchies or asymmetric formations of erotic desire in or outside of marriage. Kant's argument is seen as implausible by most modern thinkers.

== Sexual rights as human rights ==
=== Present and historical perspectives ===
From a human rights and international law perspective, consent has become a key issue in sexual ethics. Nevertheless, historically, this has not necessarily been the case. Throughout history, a whole range of consensual sexual acts, such as adultery, fornication, interracial or interfaith sex, 'sodomy' (see sodomy laws) have been prohibited; while at the same time various forced sexual encounters such as rape of a slave, prostitute, war enemy, and most notably of a spouse, were not illegal. The criminalization of marital rape is recent, having occurred during the past few decades, and the act is still legal in many places around the world – this is due to some not essentially viewing the act as rape. In the UK, marital rape was made illegal as recently as 1992. Outside the West, in many countries, consent is still not central and some consensual sexual acts are forbidden. For instance, adultery and homosexual acts remain illegal in many countries.

Many modern systems of ethics hold that sexual activity is morally permissible only if all participants consent. Sexual ethics also considers whether a person is capable of giving consent and what sort of acts they can properly consent to. In western countries, the legal concept of "informed consent" often sets the public standards on this issue. Children, the mentally handicapped, the mentally ill, animals, prisoners, and people under the influence of drugs like alcohol might be considered in certain situations as lacking an ability to give informed consent. In the United States, Maouloud Baby v. State is a state court case ruling that a person can withdraw sexual consent and that continuing sexual activity in the absence of consent may constitute rape. Also, if infected with a sexually transmitted infection, it is important that one notifies the partner before sexual contact.

Sexual acts which are illegal, and often considered unethical, because of the absence of consent include rape and molestation. Enthusiastic consent, as expressed in the slogan "Yes means yes", rather than marriage, is typically the focus of liberal sexual ethics. Under that view passivity, not saying "No", is not consent. An individual can give consent for one act of sexual activity, however, it does not condone proceeding into other acts of sexual activity without reestablishing consent.

The concept of consent being the primary arbiter of sexual ethics and morality has drawn criticism from both feminist and religious philosophies. Religious criticisms argue that relying on consent alone to determine morality ignores other intrinsic moral factors, while feminist criticisms argue that consent is too broad and does not always account for disproportionate power dynamics.

=== Feminist views ===
The feminist position is that women's freedom of choice regarding sexuality takes precedence over family, community, state, and church. Based on historical and cultural context, feminist views on sexuality has widely varied. Sexual representation in the media, the sex industry, and related topics pertaining to sexual consent are all questions which feminist theory attempts to address. The debate resulting from the divergence of feminist attitudes culminated in the late 1970s and the 1980s. The resulting discursive dualism was one which contrasted those feminists who believed that patriarchal structure made consent impossible under certain conditions, whereas sex-positive feminists attempted to redefine and regain control of what it means to be a woman. Questions of sexual ethics remain relevant to feminist theory.

Early feminists were accused of being 'wanton' as a consequence of stating that just as for men, women did not necessarily have to have sex with the intention of reproducing. At the beginning of the 20th century, feminist authors were already theorising about a relationship between a man and a woman as equals (although this has a heterosexual bias) and the idea that relationships should be sincere, that the mark of virtue in a relationship was its sincerity rather than its permanence. Setting a standard for reciprocity in relationships fundamentally changed notions of sexuality from one of duty to one of intimacy.

=== Age of consent ===
Age of consent is also a key issue in sexual ethics. It is a controversial question of whether or not minors should be allowed to have sex for recreation or engage in sexual activities such as sexting. The debate includes whether or not minors can meaningfully consent to have sex with each other, and whether they can meaningfully consent to have sex with adults. In many places in the world, people are not legally allowed to have sex until they reach a set age. The age of consent averages around the age of 16. Some areas have 'Romeo and Juliet' laws, which place a frame around teenage relationships within a certain age bracket, but do not permit sex between those above or below a certain age.

== Marriage ==
In all cultures, consensual sexual intercourse is acceptable within marriage. In some cultures sexual intercourse outside marriage is controversial, if not totally unacceptable, or even illegal. In some countries, such as Saudi Arabia, Pakistan, Afghanistan, Iran, Kuwait, Maldives, Morocco, Oman, Mauritania, United Arab Emirates, Sudan, Yemen, any form of sexual activity outside marriage is illegal.

As the philosopher Michel Foucault has noted, such societies often create spaces or heterotopias outside themselves where sex outside marriage can be practiced. According to his theory, this was the reason for the often unusual sexual ethics displayed by persons living in brothels, asylums, on board ships, or in prisons. Sexual expression was freed of social controls in such places whereas, within society, sexuality has been controlled through the institution of marriage which socially sanctions the sex act. Many different types of marriage exist, but in most cultures that practice marriage, extramarital sex without the approval of the partner is often considered to be unethical. There are a number of complex issues that fall under the category of marriage.

When one member of a marital union has sexual intercourse with another person without the consent of their spouse, it may be considered to be infidelity. In some cultures, this act may be considered ethical if the spouse consents, or acceptable as long as the partner is not married while other cultures might view any sexual intercourse outside marriage as unethical, with or without consent.

Furthermore, the institution of marriage brings up the issue of premarital sex wherein people who may choose to at some point in their lives marry, engage in sexual activity with partners who they may or may not marry. Various cultures have different attitudes about the ethics of such behavior, some condemning it while others view it to be normal and acceptable.

=== Premarital sex ===
There are persons, groups and cultures that consider premarital sex to be immoral, or even sinful, and refer to such behaviour as fornication. In recent decades, premarital sex has increasingly been regarded as less socially or morally objectionable, especially within Western cultures.

=== Extramarital sex ===
Similarly, but perhaps more than sex by unmarried persons, extramarital sex may be regarded as immoral or sinful by some, and referred to as adultery, infidelity or "cheating", while some cultures, groups or individuals regard extramarital sex as acceptable.

=== Non-monogamy ===
Monogamy, especially in Christian societies, is widely regarded as a norm, and polygamy is deprecated. Even within polygamous societies, polyandry is regarded as unacceptable. Today, the practice, especially in Western cultures, of polyamory or open marriage raises ethical or moral issues.

== Individuals and societies ==
Most societies disapprove of a person in a position of power to engage in sexual activity with a subordinate. This is often considered unethical simply as a breach of trust. When the person takes advantage of a position of power in the workplace, this may constitute sexual harassment, because subordinates may be unable to give proper consent to a sexual advance because of a fear of repercussions.

Child-parent incest is also seen as an abuse of a position of trust and power, in addition to the inability of a child to give consent. Incest between adults may not involve this lack of consent, and is, therefore, less clear-cut for most observers. Many professional organizations have rules forbidding sexual relations between members and their clients. Examples in many countries include psychiatrists, psychologists, therapists, doctors, and lawyers. In addition, laws exist against this kind of abuse of power by priests, preachers, teachers, religious counselors, and coaches.

=== Public health ===
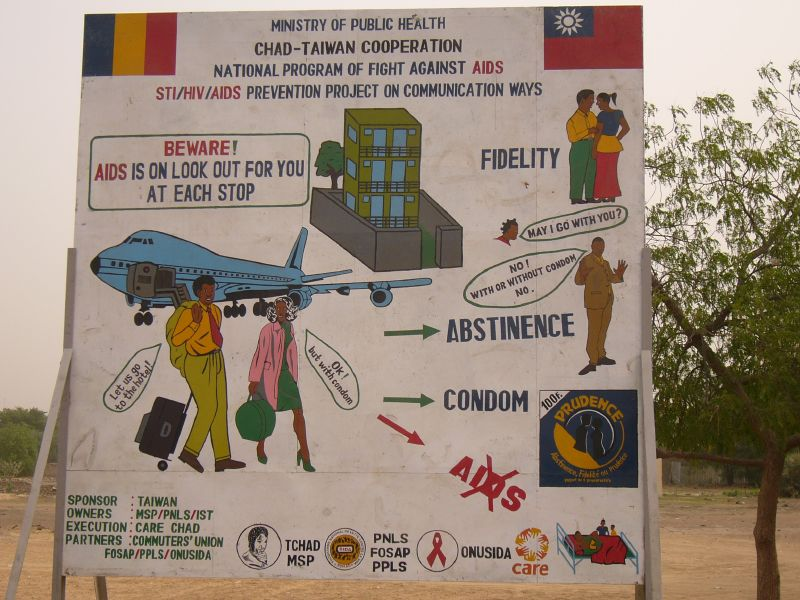
A billboard in Chad encouraging fidelity, abstinence, and condom use to help prevent AIDS

In countries where public health is considered a public concern, there is also the issue of how sex impacts the health of individuals. In such circumstances, where there are health impacts resulting from certain sexual activities, there is the question of whether individuals have an ethical responsibility to the public at large for their behavior. Such concerns might involve the regular periodic testing for sexually transmitted infections, disclosure of infection with sexually transmitted infections, responsibility for taking safer sex precautions, ethics of sex without using contraception, leading to an increased level of unplanned pregnancies and unwanted children, and just what amount of personal care an individual needs to take in order to meet his or her requisite contribution to the general health of a nation's citizens.

Moving forward there is going to be more restrictions on conscription with the global population exponentially increasing like it is. But in terms of practicality, and by more modern Malthusianism, putting a limit on amount of babies one can have seems like one of the few going theories we have to limit it. However, this brings in major ethical issues on what to do if families happen to go over the limit.

=== Public decency ===
Legal and social dress codes are often related to sexuality. In the United States, there are many rules against nudity. An individual cannot be naked even on their own property if the public can see them. These laws are often considered a violation to the constitution regarding freedom of expression. Nevertheless, Hawaii, Texas, New York, Maine, and Ohio allow all women to go topless at all locations that let men be shirtless. In California it is not illegal to hike in the nude, however it may be frowned upon or considered shocking. Also in state parks it is legal to sunbathe in the nude unless a private citizen complains then the individual is to be removed from the premise by force if the individual does not comply.

Breastfeeding in public is sometimes considered taboo, and mothers are encouraged to either cover themselves in a blanket or go to the restroom to breastfeed their newborn. In many circumstances the appropriateness of public breastfeeding is left to be determined by the mother's judgment. There do, however, exist laws prohibiting the action of breastfeeding in public, notably in jurisdictions of Illinois and Missouri.

== Sex work ==
Various sexual acts are traded for money or other goods across the world. Ethical positions on sex work may depend on the type of sex act traded and the conditions in which it is traded, there are for example additional ethical concerns over the abrogation of autonomy in the situation of trafficked sex workers.

Sex work has been a particularity divisive issue within feminism. Some feminists may regard sex work as an example of societal oppression of the sex workers by the patriarchy. The ethical argument underlying this position is that despite the apparent consent of the sex worker, the choice to engage in sex work is often not an autonomous choice, because of economic, familial or societal pressures. Sex work may also be seen as an objectification of women. An opposing view held by other feminists such as Wendy McElroy is that sex work is a means of empowering women, the argument here being that in sex work women are able to extract psychological and financial power over men which is a justified correction of the power unbalance inherent in a patriarchal society. Some feminists regard to sex work as simply a form of labor which is neither morally good or bad, but subject to the same difficulties of other labor forms.

If sex work is accepted as unethical, there is then the dispute over which parties of the contract are responsible for the ethical or legal breach. Traditionally, in many societies, the legal and ethical burden of guilt has been placed largely on the sex worker rather than consumers. In recent decades, some countries such as Sweden, Norway and Iceland have rewritten their laws to outlaw the buying of sexual services but not its sale (although they still retain laws and use enforcement tactics which sex workers say are deleterious to their safety, such as pressuring to have sex workers evicted from their residences).

== Homosexuality ==
In the ancient Levant, persons who committed homosexual acts were stoned to death at the same period in history that young Alcibiades attempted to seduce Socrates to glean wisdom from him. As presented by Plato in his Symposium, Socrates did not "dally" with young Alcibiades, and instead treated him as his father or brother would when they spent the night sharing a blanket. In Xenophon's Symposium Socrates strongly speaks against men kissing each other, saying that doing so will make them slavish, i.e., risk something that seems akin to an addiction to homosexual acts.

Most modern secular ethicists since the heyday of Utilitarianism, e.g. T.M. Scanlon and Bernard Williams, have constructed systems of ethics whereby homosexuality is a matter of individual choice and where ethical questions have been answered by an appeal to non-interference in activities involving consenting adults. However, Scanlon's system, notably, goes in a slightly different direction from this and requires that no person who meets certain criteria could rationally reject a principle that either sanctions or condemns a certain act. Under Scanlon's system, it is difficult to see how one would construct a principle condemning homosexuality outright, although certain acts, such as homosexual rape, would still be fairly straightforward cases of unethical behavior.

== See also ==
- Anti-pornography movement
- Antisexualism
- Bugchasing and giftgiving
- Covert incest
- The Ethical Slut
- Free love
- Hookup culture
- Kantian sexual ethics
- Religion and sexuality
  - Catholicism and sexuality
  - Islamic sexual jurisprudence
- Sex-positive movement
- Sexual and reproductive health and rights
- Sexual harassment
- Sexual immorality
- Sexual objectification
- Sexual revolution
- Swinging lifestyle
