= Laskey, Jaggard and Brown v United Kingdom =

1997 British gay rights legal case

Laskey, Jaggard and Brown v. United Kingdom is a case that was argued before the European Court of Human Rights, which ruled in February 1997, that no violation of Article 8 of the European Convention on Human Rights occurred.

== Facts ==
During an investigation led by the Obscene Publications Squad of the Metropolitan Police, several video tapes of homosexual, sado-masochistic sexual encounters were obtained by the police. These encounters involved the applicants and possibly as many as forty-four other men. On the basis of their violent sadomasochistic actions, the men were convicted for assault occasioning actual bodily harm. In R v Brown, the House of Lords upheld their judgement, finding that consent was not a defence to their actions in these circumstances. The applicants believed that a violation of Article 8 had not occurred because the activities were consensual, conducted in a private setting, and none of the participants required medical attention.

== Judgment ==
The European Court of Human Rights unanimously ruled that no violation of Article 8 occurred because the amount of physical or psychological harm that the law allows between any two people, even consenting adults, is to be determined by the State the individuals live in, as it is the State's responsibility to balance the concerns of public health and well-being with the amount of control a State should be allowed to exercise over its citizens.

More specifically, the Court ruled that the reasons that the police gave for confiscating the tapes were valid, and that the action was justified granted the number of charges that were brought against the applicants. The ruling also questioned whether or not the tapes could be considered part of the applicants' private lives, because so many people were involved in the footage, as well as because the applicants made and distributed the recordings in the first place.

The Court stressed that the ruling in Laskey, Jaggard and Brown v United Kingdom should be seen as distinct from that in Dudgeon v United Kingdom, an earlier, similar case relating to sexual behavior between consenting adults.

== Related case ==
- K. A. and A. D. v. Belgium (17.2.2005, applications 42758/98 and 45558/99)
- ADT v. UK 21.7.2000

== See also ==
- Operation Spanner
