= R v Clarkson =

R v Clarkson (David) (1971) 55 Cr. App. Rep. 445 is an English criminal law case, dealing with aiding and abetting and accessorial liability. The court ruled that for aiding and abetting to have taken place, there must be evidence of active encouragement of the crime.

The defendant watched as a woman was raped three times although there was no evidence that he encouraged the action.

Since there is no offence of omission in English law unless a duty of care is present, the defendant's actions were not indictable, and his appeal was successful.

== See also ==
- R v. Coney (1882)
