= Maouloud Baby v. State =

Maryland state court case

State v. Baby
- Court: Maryland Court of Appeals
- Full case name: State of Maryland v. Maouloud Baby.
- Decided: April 16, 2008
- Citations: 946 A.2d 463; 404 Md. 220

Court membership
- Judges sitting: Robert M. Bell, Irma S. Raker, Glenn T. Harrell Jr., Lynne A. Battaglia, Clayton Greene Jr., Alan M. Wilner, Dale R. Cathell (Note: Both Wilner and Cathell were retired justices assigned to the court.)

Case opinions
- Decision by: Battaglia
- Concurrence: Greene, Cathell
- Concur/dissent: Bell, Raker, Harrell, Wilner

Keywords
- Consent (criminal law); Rape

Maouloud Baby v. State of Maryland (aka Maryland v. Baby) is a Maryland state court case relating to the ability to withdraw sexual consent.

Initially, the two men involved were charged as adults with first-degree rape. First defendant, Michael Wilson, pleaded guilty to second-degree rape and was sentenced to 18 months. Maouloud Baby's first trial ended in a mistrial. In his second trial, he was convicted of the state crimes of first-degree rape, first-degree sexual offense and third-degree sexual offense. Baby appealed on the grounds that the trial judge had refused to answer questions from the jury on whether rape includes consensual intercourse that becomes non-consensual. In 2006 the Maryland Court of Special Appeals held that the judge should have answered in the negative, reversed Baby's convictions, and remanded the case for re-trial. The prosecution cross-appealed to the state Court of Appeals. That court held in 2007 that the judge should have answered in the positive: "Post-penetration withdrawal of consent negates initial consent for the purposes of sexual offense crimes and, when coupled with the other elements, may constitute the crime of rape" - but affirmed the reversal of conviction and remand due to court error.

== J.L's testimony ==
As detailed in court testimony quoted in the Court of Appeals opinion, on December 13, 2003, Maouloud Baby (1988- ), age 15, and a classmate, Michael Wilson, were students at Watkins Mill High School in Montgomery Village, Maryland. Baby and Wilson were in a car with an 18-year-old woman from Montgomery College who they were acquainted with. As the car was parked, Baby and Wilson asked the woman to sit with them in back of the car. After she did they began touching her sexually. They told her that she would not be able to leave until "they finished whatever they told [her] to do". Baby got out of the car and Wilson had sex with her. After, Baby returned and began talking to her. When asked if she felt like she had a choice whether or not to have intercourse with him, she said "Not really. I don't know. Something just clicked off and I just did whatever they said." Baby then said "So are you going to let me hit it?" She replied "As long as [you] stop when I tell [you] to." She said the intercourse was becoming painful and she asked him to stop and he stopped about 5 seconds later and did not ejaculate. The three then ate at a McDonald's, where the woman left after giving Baby her phone number. Later that day, the woman talked to a friend's mother about the encounter, leading to the initial report of rape.

== Baby and Wilson's testimony ==
Baby and Wilson differed in large parts with the above testimony. They stated that at no time were they together in the back seat of the car, nor did they say she wouldn't be allowed to leave the car at any time. Baby and Wilson maintained that she was in the front passenger seat for the entire duration of the incident, and could have "easily left the car if she wanted to". After Wilson had had sexual intercourse with J.L, Baby returned to the car and took his place in the drivers seat. At which point he asked J.L "So are you going to let me hit it?" She replied "As long as [you] stop when I tell [you] to." He stated that once he had put the condom on, he couldn't get his penis into her vagina: "...it wouldn't go in, and I tried a couple more times and it wouldn't go in. I didn't feel nothing there". "And then she sat up. She was like, "It's not going to go in," and that's when, after she sat up and said "It's not going to go in," that's when I took off the condom and I put it in my pocket and then knocked on the window for Michael to come in." He further testified that he had never had sexual intercourse before the incident. He was aged 15 when the incident took place.

== Courts ==
The jury in the trial court convicted Baby of first degree rape and related charges, but the Court of Special Appeals, based upon a 1980 precedent that held that a rape could not legally occur if a woman withdrew consent after penetration, reversed the conviction. That precedent interpreted the English common law such that the withdrawal of consent following initial penetration did not make the act a rape. The court noted other states had noted that the act of intercourse is not completed at the initial penetration, and so consent could be withdrawn at any point during intercourse. For rape, the court noted that force or threat of force was a necessary element of the crime. Due to issues involving the instructions to the jury regarding rape and consent, the case was remanded for a new trial.

In 2008, the Court of Appeals affirmed the Court of Special Appeals' reversal of the convictions and remand for re-trial, due to the trial court's error in failing to answer the jury's questions about whether a sex act continued after the withdrawal of consent could constitute rape if penetration had already occurred. However, the court ruled that consent could be withdrawn at any time, even if the victim had initially consented.

== See also ==
- Sex and the law
- Sexual ethics
- Sexual assault
- Spousal rape
