= Linda Fairstein =

American attorney and author (born 1947)

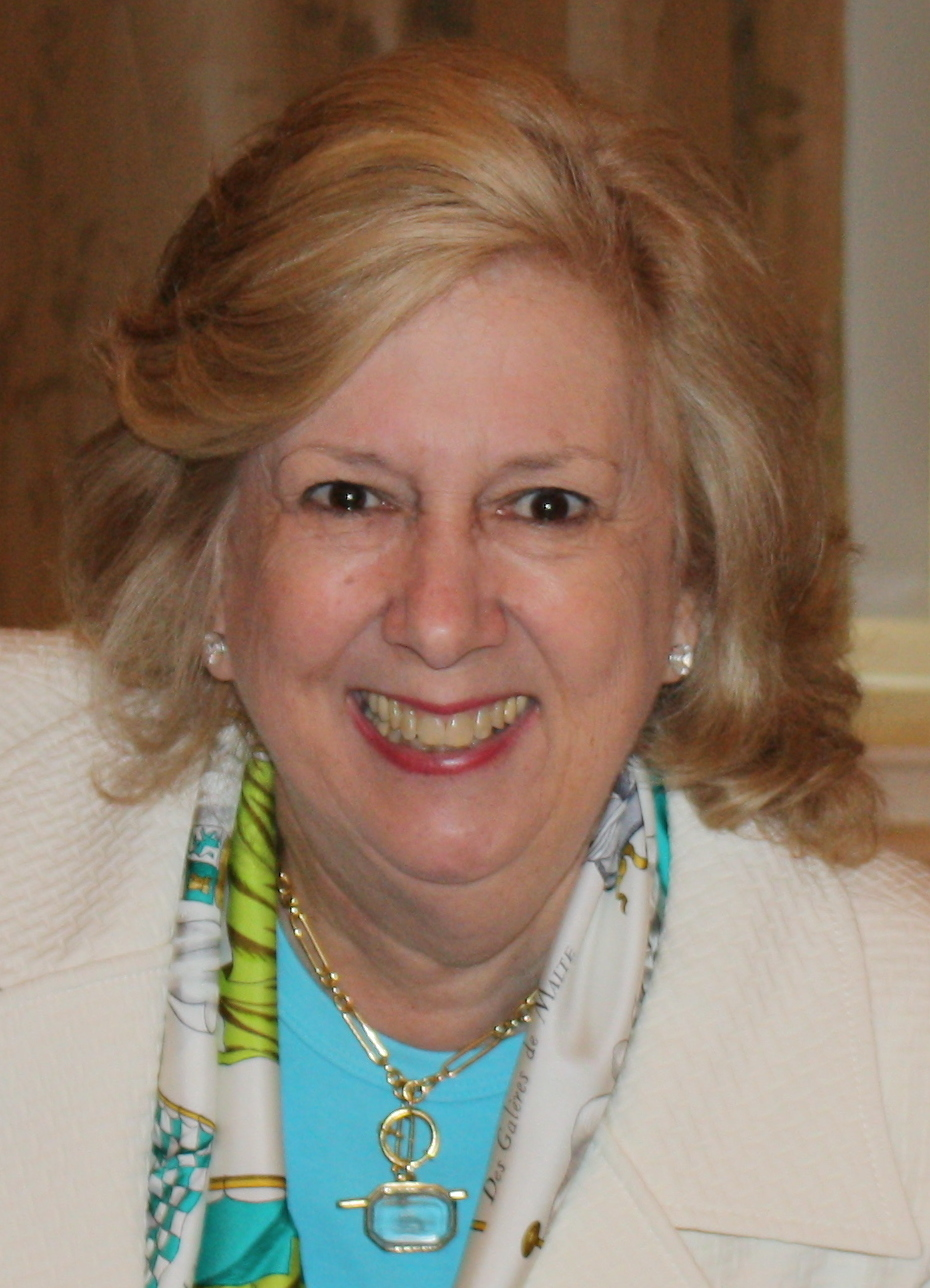
- Linda Fairstein (2009)
- Born: May 5, 1947 (age 79); Mount Vernon, New York, U.S.
- Education: Vassar College (AB); University of Virginia (JD)
- Occupation: Novelist
- Spouses: Justin Feldman (m. 1987; died 2011) Michael Goldberg (m. 2014)
- Writing career
- Period: 1996–present
- Genre: Crime
- Website: Official website

Linda Fairstein (born May 5, 1947) is an American author, attorney, and former New York City prosecutor focusing on crimes of violence against women and children. She was the head of the sex crimes unit of the Manhattan District Attorney's office from 1976 until 2002.

During that time, she oversaw the prosecution of the Central Park Five case, wherein five teenagers (four African-American and one Hispanic), were wrongfully convicted for the 1989 rape and assault in Central Park of a white female jogger. All five convictions were vacated in 2002 after Matias Reyes, a convicted serial rapist and murderer, confessed to having been the sole perpetrator of the crime, and DNA testing showed he was the sole contributor of the DNA of the semen on the victim. After Reyes' confession in 2002, Fairstein still maintained that the wrongfully convicted teenage boys were guilty and she lauded the police investigation as "brilliant". In 2018, she insisted that the teenagers' confessions had not been coerced.

After she left the DA's office in 2002, Fairstein began to publish mystery novels featuring Manhattan prosecutor Alexandra Cooper. Several have been bestsellers. It was not until June 2019, in response to the attention associated with the release of the Netflix series When They See Us about the Central Park Five, that Fairstein's publisher, Dutton, dropped her. She was also asked to resign from the boards of at least two not-for-profit organizations.

== Early life ==
Linda A. Fairstein was born on May 5, 1947, to physician Samuel Johnson Fairstein and registered nurse Alice Atwell Fairstein, an upper-middle-class family in Mount Vernon, New York.

Fairstein grew up in Mount Vernon, New York. Her father's family were Russian Jews who immigrated in the early 1900s. Her mother is of Northern Irish, Finnish and Swedish descent.

== Education ==
Fairstein graduated with honors from Vassar College in 1969, with a degree in English literature. She graduated from the University of Virginia School of Law in 1972, where she was one of a dozen women in her class.

== Early career ==
Fairstein joined the Manhattan District Attorney's office in 1972 as an Assistant District Attorney. In 1976 she was promoted to the head of the sex crimes unit, where she worked to support victims of crime.

== Central Park Jogger case ==
=== Investigation, conviction and appeal ===
Fairstein's office supervised the prosecution in 1989 and 1990 of the Central Park Jogger case, which ended in the conviction of five teenagers whose convictions were later vacated. In a civil rights lawsuit filed in 2003, the five who were convicted claimed that Fairstein, with the assistance of the detectives at the 20th Precinct, coerced false confessions from them following up to thirty straight hours of interrogation and intimidation, of both the youths and their supporting adults. When Assistant US attorney David Nocenti, a "Big Brother" mentor to Yusef Salaam, one of the defendants, appeared at the precinct while the defendant was being grilled, plaintiffs claimed, Fairstein verbally abused him, demanded he leave immediately, and called her husband to demand the home number of Nocenti's boss, Brooklyn US Attorney Andrew Maloney, so she could get the young attorney fired.

Fairstein said "Nobody under sixteen was talked to until a parent or guardian arrived... Three of the five went home and had a night's sleep before they were ever taken into custody. For most of them, the substance of their admissions came out within about an hour of the time they came in... I think Reyes ran with that pack of kids. He stayed longer when the others moved on. He completed the assault. I don't think there is a question in the minds of anyone present during the interrogation process that these five men were participants, not only in the other attacks that night but in the attack on the jogger. I watched more than thirty detectives—black, white, Hispanic guys who'd never met each other before—conduct a brilliant investigation." Lawyers for the five defendants contested almost every element of Fairstein's statement.

All five accused teenagers later claimed their confessions were coerced during interrogation through lies and intimidation. In 1990 each of the "Central Park Five" were convicted of various assault and sexual battery charges, based in part on the allegedly false confessions obtained from them in 1989. Antron McCray, Kevin Richardson, Raymond Santana and Korey Wise had signed written confessions, while Yousef Salaam made a verbal confession but refused to sign.

Their convictions were upheld on appeal. Appellate court judge Vito Titone specifically named Fairstein in his dissenting opinion on the Salaam appeal. He said in an interview, "I was concerned about a criminal justice system that would tolerate the conduct of the prosecutor, Linda Fairstein, who deliberately engineered the 15-year-old's confession. ... Fairstein wanted to make a name. She didn't care. She wasn't a human."

=== Vacating of convictions ===
All five convictions were vacated in 2002 after convicted rapist Matias Reyes confessed to the crime. Reyes confessed after he "found religion." The police had recovered DNA of only one man at the site of the crime, and none of the Central Park Five matched. The semen found on the victim contained DNA matching that of Reyes, confirming that he was the sole contributor, to a certainty of six billion to one.

=== Aftermath ===
In 2003, Kevin Richardson, Raymond Santana Jr., and Antron McCray sued the city of New York for malicious prosecution, racial discrimination and emotional distress. It wasn't until Mayor De Blasio took office 11 years later that a settlement in the case was reached on June 19, 2014, for $41 million.

Ken Burns and his daughter Sarah and her husband made a documentary film about the case, which he compared to the Scottsboro Boys case. The film, The Central Park Five, premiered at the Cannes Film Festival in May 2012 and was released on November 23, 2012. A Pulitzer Prize winning opera, The Central Park Five, was also written about the case.

In May 2019, Netflix released a four-part drama series, When They See Us, about the case, directed by Ava DuVernay. In it, actress Felicity Huffman portrays Fairstein. Soon after the release, Fairstein's publisher, E.P. Dutton, released her as a client. Fairstein was also forced to resign from various non-profit board roles, including Safe Horizon. Fairstein also resigned from the Board of Trustees of Vassar College, her alma mater, after considerable pressure from the student body and members of the administration.

On June 10, 2019, the Wall Street Journal published an op-ed by Fairstein, Netflix’s False Story of the Central Park Five, in which she says that the five were not "totally innocent" (citing the other crimes they were convicted of, for which, she asserts, there is still substantial evidence) and that DuVernay had defamed her. In March 2020, Fairstein filed suit in the U.S. District Court for the Middle District of Florida against Netflix, DuVernay, and series writer Attica Locke for defamation based on her portrayal in the series.

As of 2021 following Netflix's request for it to be dismissed, the lawsuit had been partially allowed to go forward while other scenes had been deemed not to be defamatory. On June 4, 2024, the case was settled, with Netflix donating $1 million to Innocence Project and no payment being made to Fairstein. “[Fairstein] walked away with no payment to her or her lawyers of any kind, rather than face cross examination before a New York jury,” DuVernay said.

== Later career ==
During her tenure, Fairstein prosecuted controversial and highly publicized cases, such as the "Preppy Murder case" against Robert Chambers in 1986, and the 1998 People v. Jovanovic cases.

Fairstein left the District Attorney's office in 2002, and has continued to consult, write, lecture and serve as a sex crimes expert for a wide variety of print and television media outlets, including CNN, MSNBC and Larry King, among others. She has consulted for a number of media outlets during a number of high-profile prosecutions, including Michael Jackson's molestation charges in 2004, Kobe Bryant's sexual assault charges, and Scott Peterson's trial.

=== Jovanovic controversy ===
In 2004 Oliver Jovanovic sued Fairstein, alleging that she engaged in "false arrest, malicious prosecution, malicious abuse of process and denial of his right to a fair trial". This lawsuit stemmed from Fairstein's successful prosecution of Jovanovic in the case People v. Jovanovic, which was subsequently overturned on appeal. The case was later dismissed with prejudice by a new trial judge. The dismissal was requested "in the interest of justice" by the office of the Manhattan district attorney, Robert M. Morgenthau. There was no physical evidence linking Jovanovic to the crime. While his accuser claimed she had been brutally attacked and left bleeding, she was found to have only a few fading bruises. "If she [Fairstein] couldn't tell this was a false report, well, I am just shocked," said former New York City sex crimes detective John Baeza, who worked in defense of Jovanovic after leaving the force.

The $10 million lawsuit against Fairstein and two co-defendants, former Manhattan Assistant District Attorney Gail Heatherly, who teaches at the Columbia Law School, and New York City Police Detective Milton Bonilla, was dismissed on summary judgment in September 2010.

=== Dominique Strauss-Kahn ===
Fairstein assisted District Attorney Vance in his decision not to prosecute Dominique Strauss-Kahn for sexual assault in 2012. Fairstein's writing skills came into play in writing up the decision not to charge.

She was also reportedly involved with the defense of Harvey Weinstein, helping to silence one of the sexual harassment complaints against him.

Fairstein founded the Domestic Violence Committee of the New York Women's Agenda. She is a frequent speaker on issues related to domestic abuse.

== Awards ==
Among the awards Fairstein has received are the Federal Bar Council's Emory Buckner Award for Public Service, the Nero Wolfe Award for Excellence in Crime Writing, and Glamour Magazine's Woman of the Year Award. In 2019, shortly after the release of the Netflix series When They See Us about the Central Park Five case, Glamour Magazine said that the 1993 Woman of the Year Award to Fairstein was a mistake and that it was given to her before the full facts of the case were known.

In 2018, the Mystery Writers of America announced that it would honor Fairstein with one of its "Grand Master" awards for literary achievement. But two days after renewed controversy erupted in connection with her role in the case, the organization withdrew the honor.

=== Other honors ===
- UJA Federation’s Proskauer Award
- Columbia University School of Nursing's Second Century Award for Excellence in Health Care
- American Heart Association Women of Courage Award
- New York Women's Agenda 2010 Lifetime Achievement Award
- International Thriller Writers 2010 Silver Bullet Award

== Writing ==
=== Alexandra Cooper series ===
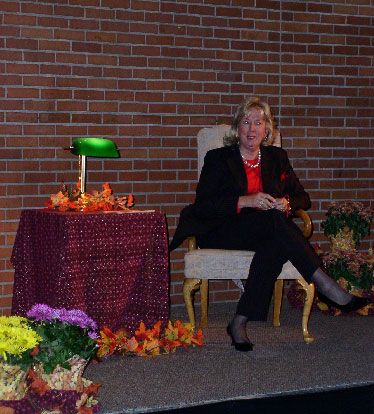
Linda Fairstein at the University of Scranton 2003 Royden B. Davis Distinguished Author Award presentation.

Fairstein has written several crime novels featuring Manhattan prosecutor Alexandra Cooper. The novels draw on Fairstein's legal expertise and several have become international best sellers.

The titles are:

- Final Jeopardy (1996)
- Likely To Die (1997)
- Cold Hit (1999)
- The Dead-House (2001) (Nero Award winner)
- The Bone Vault (2003)
- The Kills (2004)
- Entombed (2005)
- Death Dance (2006)
- Bad Blood (2007)
- Killer Heat (2008)
- Lethal Legacy (2009)
- Hell Gate (2010)
- Silent Mercy (March 2011)
- Night Watch (July 2012)
- Death Angel (2013)
- Terminal City (2014)
- Devil's Bridge (2015)
- Killer Look (2016)
- Deadfall (2017)
- Blood Oath (2019)

=== Devlin Quick series ===
- Into the Lion's Den (2016)
- Digging for Trouble (2017)
- Secrets from the Deep (2018)

=== Nonfiction ===
- Sexual Violence: Our War Against Rape (1993)

== Personal life ==
She was married to lawyer Justin Feldman from 1987 until his death in 2011 at the age of 92. In September 2014 she married lawyer Michael Goldberg, a long-time friend and classmate at the University of Virginia School of Law, at their home in Martha's Vineyard. Fairstein and Goldberg reside on the Upper East Side in New York.
