= Rough sex murder defense =

Defense claim for murdering a sexual partner during consensual sex

The Rough sex murder defense, also known as the 50 Shades defense (after Fifty Shades of Grey), is employed by some people accused of murdering a sexual partner, who claim that the death occurred because of injuries sustained during consensual sex. The advocacy group We Can't Consent To This identified 60 police suspects or defendants in the UK between 1972 and 2020, who stated this defense from the outset or later pled it. In 45% of those cases, the result was a lesser charge, a lighter sentence, an acquittal, or the case not being pursued.

In the UK, legislative amendments were proposed in 2020 and passed in April 2021 (in the Domestic Abuse Act 2021) to tackle the rough sex defence.

== Definition ==
According to American jurist George Buzash:

The "rough sex" defense to the charge of murder asserts that the victim literally "asked for" the conduct that led to the homicide and that the homicide was the result of sexual practices to which the victim consented, and may have even demanded.

The defendant frequently is convicted of a lesser offense, such as voluntary manslaughter or criminally negligent homicide.

== History ==
The earliest known use of the defense in the UK was after the death of Carole Califano in 1972; her abusive partner was able to get the criminal charge reduced to manslaughter. In the United States, the defense began to be used in the 1980s. In 1988, it was reported that the rough sex defense was becoming more popular in the US among men suspected of murdering their female partners because of the 1986 case of Robert Chambers. Also in 1986, 17-year-old Kathleen Holland from Long Island was killed by her boyfriend, Joseph Porto. He later claimed that she had died during a "rough sex" accident due to erotic asphyxiation gone awry. In 1988, he was acquitted of murder and manslaughter but convicted on a lesser charge and served 30 months in jail. In 1989, American jurist Buzash recommended a "strict liability approach to 'rough sex' homicides" in order to prevent defendants from claiming the rough sex defense; he felt that it rewarded perjury. In 2014, Denzil Wells II from Toledo, Ohio, pled guilty to reckless homicide and obstructing justice after his girlfriend died in what he claimed was an erotic asphyxiation-related accident, but avoided murder charges.

The defense was brought to wider public attention by cases such as the killing of Cindy Gladue in Canada in 2011, the killing of Natalie Connolly in the United Kingdom in 2018, and the murder of Grace Millane, a British tourist in New Zealand, in 2018. New Zealand Detective Inspector Scott Beard said that he opposes the defense: "I don't believe that rough sex should be a defence ... If people are going to use that as a defence, all it's going to do is revictimise the victim and their family."

The feminist organization We Can't Consent to This reported a 90% increase in the use of rough sex defense in the courtroom since 2010. Canadian legal scholar Elaine Craig observed the same phenomenon that the vast majority of reported sexual assault cases in which consensual rough sex is raised have occurred in the past ten years.

Advocacy group We Can't Consent to This has noted 60 police suspects or defendants in the UK having used the defense from 1972 to 2020, with 45 percent of these defences resulting in a lesser charge, lighter sentence, acquittal, or the case not being pursued. According to experts, its use became more frequent during the same period.

== Legislative proposals ==
Some campaigners, such as We Can't Consent to This and Toni Van Pelt of the National Organization for Women, consider the defense a form of victim blaming and advocate for it to be banned.

In the UK, the Domestic Abuse Bill 2019, which included a provision against the "rough sex" murder defence, was debated before the 2019 prorogation of Parliament. Labour MP Harriet Harman and Conservative MP Mark Garnier advocated the bill; Harman believes that men who kill their partners should be prosecuted for murder even if they did not intend the partner to die. Boris Johnson, prime minister of the United Kingdom, said "I agree with Harriet Harman that the '50 Shades defence' is unacceptable and we'll make sure the law is clear on this." Jeremy Corbyn, former leader of the Labour party, said that he would re-introduce the time-lapsed bill if elected: "We will make sure that the ‘50 Shades defence’ is banned, including it directly in our bill." Former Liberal Democrat leader Jo Swinson also said that her party supports a statutory ban on the use of the defense. On 6 July 2020, MPs voted in favour of the Domestic Abuse Bill, which brought into statute R v Brown case law, (a decision of 1993 of the highest UK court that holds that a person cannot consent to harm amounting to actual bodily harm during sado-masochism, as the criminal law in general abhors harm to that degree); the Bill included the introduction of a Director of Public Prosecutions review in cases of domestic killing when prosecutors suggest a lesser crime of manslaughter. The Domestic Abuse Bill received Royal Assent on 29 April 2021, becoming the Domestic Abuse Act 2021.

== Criticism ==
Barristers have questioned whether the "rough sex defence" is a defence which actually exists, noting that intent is required for a murder charge and pointing out that consent has never been a defense in homicide cases.

The decision to codify R v Brown has also been criticised by several barristers who have described it as "a horrendous intrusion into human rights and freedoms", an "extreme measure" and have argued that "The law makes the distinction [between murder and manslaughter] because murder charges are, rightly, reserved for instances when someone deliberately and intentionally causes someone at least serious harm which results in their death".
