= Consent (criminal law) =

Concept in criminal law

In criminal law, consent may be used as an excuse and prevent the defendant from incurring liability for what was done.

== Defenses against criminal liability ==
A defense against criminal liability may arise when a defendant can argue that, because of consent, there was no crime (e.g., arguing that permission was given to use an automobile, so it was not theft or taken without owner's consent). But public policy requires courts to lay down limits on the extent to which citizens are allowed to consent or are to be bound by apparent consent given.

As an application of parens patriae, for example, minors cannot consent to having sexual intercourse under a specified age even though the particular instance of statutory rape might be a "victimless" offense. In the case of adults, there are similar limits imposed on their capacity where the state deems the issue to be of sufficient significance. Thus, for example, an individual domiciled in a common law state cannot give consent and create a valid second marriage. The second ceremony will do no more than expose the prospective spouse to a charge of bigamy. Similarly, no consent can be given for an incestuous relationship nor for relationships that expose one of the parties to excessive violence (e.g. most states have a rule that an abusive husband can be prosecuted even if the wife does not co-operate and give evidence to rebut the husband's defense that the wife consented).

In English law, the Sexual Offences Act 2003 removes the element of consent from the actus reus of many offenses, so that only the act itself and the age or other constraints need to be proved, including:

children under 16 years generally, and under 18 years if having sexual relations with persons in a position of trust; and persons with a mental disorder that impedes choice who are induced, threatened, or deceived, or who have sexual relations with care workers.

Most states have laws which criminalize misrepresentations, deceptions, and fraud. These are situations in which a victim may have given apparent consent to parting with ownership or possession of money and/or goods, or to generally suffering a loss, but this consent is treated as vitiated by the dishonesty of the person making the untrue representations. Thus, while the criminal law is not generally a means of escaping civil obligations, the criminal courts may be able to offer some assistance to the gullible by returning their property or making compensation orders.

== Consensual activity ==
The problem has always been to decide at what level the victim's consent becomes ineffective. Historically in the UK, the defense was denied when the injuries caused amounted to a maim (per Hawkins' Pleas of the Crown (8th ed.) 1824). In R v Donovan (1934) AER 207 in which Swift J. stated the general rule that:

No person can license another to commit a crime, if (the jury) were satisfied that the blows struck ... were likely or intended to do bodily harm ... they ought to convict ... only if they were not so satisfied (was it) necessary to consider the further question whether the prosecution had negatived consent.

However, consent is valid in a range of circumstances, including contact sports (such as boxing or mixed martial arts), as well as tattooing and piercing. But in the context of sadomasochism, Lord Mustill in R v Brown (1993) has set the level just below actual bodily harm. R v Wilson (1996), which involved a case where a husband branded his wife's buttocks, upheld that consent can be a valid defense. The act was considered comparable to tattooing, whilst Brown applied specifically to sadomasochism.

The issue of consent in the course of sado-masochistic sexual activity was considered in R v Stein (2007), a case in which a participant died as a result of being gagged. The court held that, even if the victim had consented to a being restrained and gagged, his consent was invalid because there was no way for him to communicate its withdrawal once the gag was in his mouth.

For sado-masochism, R v Boyea (1992) 156 JPR 505 was another application of the ratio decidendi in Donovan that even if she had actually consented to injury by allowing the defendant to put his hand into her vagina and twist it, causing internal and external injuries to her vagina and bruising on her pubis, the woman's consent (if any) would have been irrelevant. The court took judicial notice of the change in social attitudes to sexual matters, but "the extent of the violence inflicted… went far beyond the risk of minor injury to which, if she did consent, her consent would have been a defence". In R v Brown, the House of Lords rejected the defense on public policy grounds (see below). This is an application of the general rule that, once an actus reus with an appropriate mens rea has been established, no defense can be admitted, but the evidence may be admitted to mitigate the sentence.

This decision was confirmed in the ECHR in Laskey v United Kingdom (1997) 24 EHRR 39 on the basis that although the prosecution might have constituted an interference with the private lives of those involved, it was justified for the protection of public health. In R v Emmett (unreported, 18 June 1999), as part of their consensual sexual activity, the woman allowed her partner to cover her head with a plastic bag, tying it tightly at the neck. On a different occasion, she agreed that he could pour fuel from a lighter onto her breasts and set fire to the fuel. On the first occasion, she was at risk of death, and lost consciousness. On the second, she suffered burns, which became infected. The court applied Brown and ruled that the woman's consent to these events did not provide a defense for her partner.

The general rule, therefore, is that violence involving the deliberate and intentional infliction of bodily harm is and remains unlawful notwithstanding that its purpose is the sexual gratification of one or both participants. Notwithstanding their sexual overtones, these cases are considered to be violent crimes and it is not an excuse that one partner consents.

Maouloud Baby v. State of Maryland was a 2007 case in the Maryland Court of Appeals, the state's highest court, which determined that a person may withdraw sexual consent after having given it, and that the continuation of sexual activity after the withdrawal of consent constitutes rape.

Alzheimer's disease or similar disabilities may result in a person being unable to give legal consent to sexual relations even with their spouse.

== Ability to consent ==
According to Rule 70 of the Rules of Procedure and Evidence (published in 2002) of the International Criminal Court (which rules on military conflicts between states), in cases of sexual violence:

a. Consent cannot be inferred by reason of any words or conduct of a victim where force, threat of force, coercion or taking advantage of a coercive environment undermined the victim's ability to give voluntary and genuine consent;
b. Consent cannot be inferred by reason of any words or conduct of a victim where the victim is incapable of giving genuine consent

In Australia, if a sexual partner was asleep, unconscious or a jury decides that a complainant was unable to consent, sexual contact is considered rape. In New South Wales, Victoria, South Australia, Tasmania and the Northern Territory, consent is not possible when the complainant was asleep or unconscious. In Victoria, South Australia, Tasmania and the Northern Territory, there is no consent where the complainant is so affected by alcohol or other drugs as "to be incapable of freely agreeing" to the sexual activity. In the Australian Capital Territory, the effect of alcohol or other drugs is less qualified; there is no consent if it is caused by "the effect of intoxicating liquor, a drug or anaesthetic". In NSW, there may be no consent where a complainant was "substantially intoxicated by alcohol or any drug". This formulation adopts the view expressed in the 2010 Family Violence – A National Legal Response report of the Criminal Justice Sexual Offences Taskforce and Australian Law Reform Commission that the degree of intoxication and whether it was such that a person was "unable to consent" are matters for the jury.

== Consent obtained by deception ==
In R v Clarence (1888) 22 QBD 23, at a time when the defendant knew that he was suffering from a venereal disease, he had sexual intercourse and communicated the disease to his wife. Had she been aware, she would not have submitted to the intercourse. The defendant was convicted of inflicting grievous bodily harm contrary to section 20 of the Offences against the Person Act 1861. On appeal the conviction was quashed. Mr Justice Willis said "...that consent obtained by fraud is no consent at all is not true as a general proposition either in fact or in law".

Mr Justice Stephens had said (at p. 44) "...the only sorts of fraud which so far destroy the effect of a woman's consent as to convert a connection consented to in fact into a rape are frauds as to the nature of the act itself, or as to the identity of the person who does the act. Consent in such cases does not exist at all because the act consented to is not the act done. Until recently, the case has never been challenged, but its current status was complicated by the then general assumptions that "infliction" required some act of violence, and that non-physical injuries could not be inflicted and so were outside the scope of the Offences Against the Person Act.

Now the ruling in R v Chan-Fook [1994] 1 WLR 689, which held that psychiatric injury could be actual bodily harm, has been confirmed by the House of Lords in R v Burstow, R v Ireland [1998] 1 Cr App R 177. These cases overrule the implicit ratio decidendi of Clarence that non-physical injuries can be injuries within the scope of the Offences Against the Person Act and without the need to prove a physical application of violence, Lord Steyn describing Clarence as a "troublesome authority", and, in the specific context of the meaning of "inflict" in section 20, said expressly that Clarence "no longer assists".

This left the issue of fraud. In R v Linekar [1995] QB 250, a prostitute stated the fact that she would not have consented to sexual intercourse if she had known that her client was not intending to pay, but there was no fraud-induced consent as to the nature of the activity, nor was the identity of the client relevant.

In R v Richardson [1998] 2 Cr App R 200, the patient believed that she was receiving dental treatment which otherwise would have given rise to an assault occasioning actual bodily harm, from a dentist who had in fact been struck off the register. The Court held that the identity of the defendant was not a feature which, in that case, precluded the giving of consent by the patient. In R v Navid Tabassum (May, 2000). The three complainant women agreed to the appellant showing them how to examine their own breasts. That involved the appellant, himself, feeling the breasts of two of the women and using a stethoscope beneath the bra of the third woman. Each of the three women said that they had only consented because they thought the appellant had either medical qualifications or relevant training. He had neither. There was no evidence of any sexual motive. He was convicted on the basis that the complainants had only consented to acts medical in nature and not to indecent behavior, that is, there was consent to the nature of the act but not its quality.

In R v Cort [2003] 3 WLR 1300, a case of kidnapping, the complainants had consented to taking a ride in a car, but not to being kidnapped. They wanted transport, not kidnapping. Kidnapping may be established by carrying away by fraud. "It is difficult to see how one could ever consent to that once fraud was indeed established. The 'nature' of the act here is therefore taking the complainant away by fraud. The complainant did not consent to that event. All that she consented to was a ride in the car, which in itself is irrelevant to the offense and a different thing from that with which Mr Cort is charged".

A paper on the website The Student Lawyer examined the basis for fraud as grounds for negating consent, in the context of the decision not to charge officers involved in the UK undercover policing relationships scandal. It concluded that the issues which might arise if this was a legal basis to negate consent, could be far wider than might be first appreciated. Examples given by the author included:

Andrew is secretly having an affair but denies this to his wife; they later have sex; Barney exaggerates his financial success and pretends to like the same music and films as his date in order to impress her; they later have sex; Charlie dyes his hair and pretends to be in his mid-30s on a dating website when he is really in his 50s; he later has sex with someone he meets online; Derek is unhappy in his marriage and is considering whether to leave his wife; he does not mention his misgivings before they have sex. In each case, their sexual partners would not have consented had they known the truth and a reasonable person might be expected to realize this.

=== Sexual transmission of disease ===
In 1998, the Home Office issued a consultation paper entitled Violence: Reforming the Offences Against the Person Act 1861 rejecting the Law Commission's recommendation that there should be offenses for the intentional or reckless transmission of disease. The Government "[was] particularly concerned that the law should not seem to discriminate against those who are HIV positive, have AIDS or viral Hepatitis or who carry any kind of disease". It did, however, accept that society should have criminal sanctions for use against "evil acts", and that this might include people who transmitted diseases causing serious illness to others with intent to do them such harm, adding that "this aims to strike a sensible balance between allowing very serious intentional acts to be punished while not rendering individuals liable for prosecution of unintentional or reckless acts or for the transmission of minor disease" (see paras 3.13-318)

In 2000, the government repeated that view in a consultation relating to the law on manslaughter, "The Government remains wholly committed to this approach." This has since been considered in R. v Dica, which deals with the transmission of HIV, holding that it was not necessary to prove that the transmission had involved an assault for the "inflicting" of the disease. The judgment rejects the rule in Clarence as tainted by the then presumption of a wife's marital consent to sexual intercourse, although Clarence was still being applied after the criminalization of rape within marriage. The more modern authorities involving the transmission of psychological conditions and in other sexual matters, reject the notion that consent can be a defense to anything more than a trivial injury.

Yet this is not without its difficulties. If it is proposed to criminalize the consensual taking of risks of infection by having unprotected sexual intercourse, enforcement is impractical. The community prefers that sexual relationships are a private matter between the individuals involved and if adults were suddenly to be liable to prosecution for taking known risks with their health, this would represent a significant interference with personal autonomy. Further, the law cannot expect people suddenly to become honest with each other and to counsel the use of condoms, and there may be negative consequences if HIV was to be disclosable, because those who ought to take medical advice and undergo tests, might be discouraged from doing so.

Consequently, the Appeal Court decided that had the women known of his infection, their consent to unprotected sexual intercourse would have been a valid defense. In this regard, they overturned the ruling of the original judge. In R. v Konzani, the defense argued that by consenting to unprotected sexual intercourse with the defendant, the women were implicitly consenting to all the risks associated with sexual intercourse which included infection with HIV. In cross-examination two of the three women had explicitly acknowledged that, in general, unprotected sexual intercourse carried a risk of infection.

However the Appeal Court judges ruled that before the complainants' consent could provide the appellant with a defense, it had to be an informed and willing consent to the specific risk, here the risk of contracting HIV, rather than the general one of contracting something. The same court held that a person accused of recklessly transmitting an STI could only raise the defense of consent, including an honest belief in consent, in cases where that consent was a "willing" or "conscious" consent. In other words, the court distinguished between "willingly running the risk of transmission" and "willingly consenting to the risk of transmission."

This suggests that consent will only operate as a defense – in all but the most exceptional of cases – where there has already been prior disclosure of known HIV positive status. Judge LJ. summaries the situation at para 42: In the public interest, so far as possible, the spread of catastrophic illness must be avoided or prevented. On the other hand, the public interest also requires that the principle of personal autonomy in the context of adult non-violent sexual relationships should be maintained. If an individual who knows that he is suffering from HIV conceals this stark fact from his sexual partner, the principle of her personal autonomy is not enhanced if he is exculpated when he recklessly transmits HIV to her through consensual sexual intercourse. On any view, the concealment of this fact from her almost inevitably means that she is deceived. Her consent is not properly informed, and she cannot give an informed consent to something of which she is ignorant. Equally, her personal autonomy is not normally protected by allowing a defendant who knows that he is suffering from HIV which he deliberately conceals, to assert an honest belief in his partner's informed consent to the risk of the transmission of HIV.

Silence in these circumstances is incongruous with honesty, or with a genuine belief that there is an informed consent. Accordingly, in such circumstances the issue either of informed consent, or honest belief in it will only rarely arise: in reality, in most cases, the contention would be wholly artificial. Baker (2009) in "Moral Limits of Consent" 12(1) New Criminal Law Review argues even if the consent in Konzani was genuine, that it like Brown was rightly decided, as Baker is of the view that a person cannot consent to irreparable harm of a grave kind without also degrading his or her humanity in the Kantian sense.

Baker also argues that the Harm Principle provides an important constraint, as it prevents the consenter from being criminalized because it is only harm to others that can be criminalized under the Harm Principle—not harm to self. Therefore, it is only those who rely on consent to inflict grave harm on their fellow humans that are criminalized under Baker's proposals. However, Baker points out that R v. Brown is more borderline, as the harm in that case was reversible and is not too different from having unnecessary plastic surgery that is no longer benefiting the patient—that is numerous surgical procedures which are clearly having a disfiguring rather than beneficial cosmetic effect.

== Preventing breaches of the peace ==
In R v Coney (1882) 8 QBD 534, members of the public who attended an illegal prize fight in a public place were convicted of aiding and abetting an assault. They were cheering on the boxers whose conduct was likely to and did produce a breach of the peace, so any mutual consent given by the fighters was vitiated by the public nature of the entertainment irrespective of the degree of injury caused or intended. Hence, the principal offense was committed and, since it would not have taken place had there been no crowd to bet and support the fighters, the secondary parties were also liable.

== Consent as an effective defense ==
In properly regulated sport, there is a legal right to cause incidental injury. This is a criminal law version of the civil law principle volenti non fit injuria (Latin for consent does not make an [actionable] injury) and the victim consents to run the risk (not the certainty) of injury arising within the rules of the game being played. This does not give sport a license to enact rules permitting acts that are clearly, excessively and maliciously violent. Even professional sport should have an element of fun while the players are, in the more extreme cases, given criminal as well as civil law protection (see R v Johnson (1986) 8 Cr App R (S) 343 and R v Lloyd (1989) CLR 513 dealing with injuries inflicted on the rugby field in "off the ball" incidents). Thus, the consent in licensed boxing events is to intentional harm within the rules and a blow struck between rounds would be an assault.

=== Horseplay ===
Where the culture supports the playing of practical jokes and active physical interaction as a form of "fun", those who become a part of that culture must accept the local standards of contact and the injuries that might result. Thus, in R v Aitken and Others [1992] 1 WLR 1006, the victim was a serving member of the Royal Air Force and the fact that he had participated in practical jokes played on his companions was accepted as evidence that he had consented to become a victim when it was "his turn".

== Legal right to cause, or consent to, injury ==
- Doctors and all health professionals have a general right to assume a patient's consent for necessary treatment (per Denning LJ in Bravery v Bravery (1954) 3 AER 59). So if a person is brought into a hospital unconscious, surgery to preserve life will not be unlawful. But, if the health authorities have actual notice that the patient does not consent, even necessary treatment will be unlawful unless either it becomes urgently necessary to take action to avoid death, or consent is given either by a spouse or relative, or by a court. There have been cases, for example, where it was not to be an assault for prison hospitals for force-feed a prisoner on hunger strike, but such cases are not of general application. When in doubt, consent should be sought from the courts. In any event, treatment will only be lawful if it is of therapeutic rather than cosmetic value. Similarly, tattooing, ear piercing and other cosmetic procedures will be lawful if there is actual consent.
- Parents and others who are in loco parentis have a limited right to administer reasonable parental punishment: see A v UK (1998) CLR 892 and H (2002) 1 Cr. App. R. 59, but teachers are prohibited from administering corporal punishment: s548 Education Act 1996: Williams v Secretary of State for Education and Employment (2005) 2 All ER 1.
- In the UK, in Operation Spanner, three men who consensually agreed to engage in consensual sadomasochism, were convicted of assault occasioning actual bodily harm. The resulting House of Lords case (R v Brown, colloquially known as "the Spanner case") ruled that consent was not a valid legal defense for wounding and actual bodily harm in the UK, except as a foreseeable incident of a lawful activity in which the person injured was participating, e.g. surgery. The convictions are seen as controversial due to issues of whether a government or one's self is justified to control one's own body in private situations where the only harm may be temporary, and to volunteering adults who gave informed consent to the types of acts involved.

== See also ==
- Rough sex murder defense
- Consent (BDSM)
- Consensual homicide
- Sexual consent
- Sexual consent in law
- Informed consent
- Age of consent
- Operation Spanner
- Medical law
- R v Brown
- Hudson v. Craft
