= Hudson v. Craft =

- Supreme Court of California

Decided March 22, 1949
- Full case name: Guy C. Hudson, a Minor, etc., et al., Appellants, v. Orville Craft, et al., Respondents.
- Citation(s): 33 Cal.2d 654; 204 P.2d 1

Holding
- It is not possible for an individual to consent to an unlawful act or deliberate harm. Judgement reversed.

Court membership
- Chief Justice: Phil S. Gibson
- Associate Justices: John W. Shenk, Douglas L. Edmonds, Jesse W. Carter, Roger J. Traynor, B. Rey Schauer, Homer R. Spence

Case opinions
- Majority: Carter, joined by Gibson, Shenk, Traynor, Schauer, Spence
- Concurrence: Edmonds

Hudson v. Craft (33 Cal.2d 654, 1949) is a United States court case defining how the court defines consent as a defense to an intentional harm.

== Facts of the Case ==
The Defendants were conducting a carnival where one of the concessions was a boxing exhibition, which was conducted in violation of statutory provisions, distributed prizes and prize money to the contestants, and no license had been issued. The Plaintiff engaged in a boxing match after being solicited by the Defendants and thereby consented to the contest.

== Ruling ==
The central holding was that an individual cannot consent to an illegal act. Therefore, regardless of whether or not the two individual fighters consented, the promoter could still be held liable for damages.

The court did not make a direct ruling to the suit between the two boxers.
