= Lambeth Magistrates' Court =

Coordinates: 51.491761°N 0.105374°W

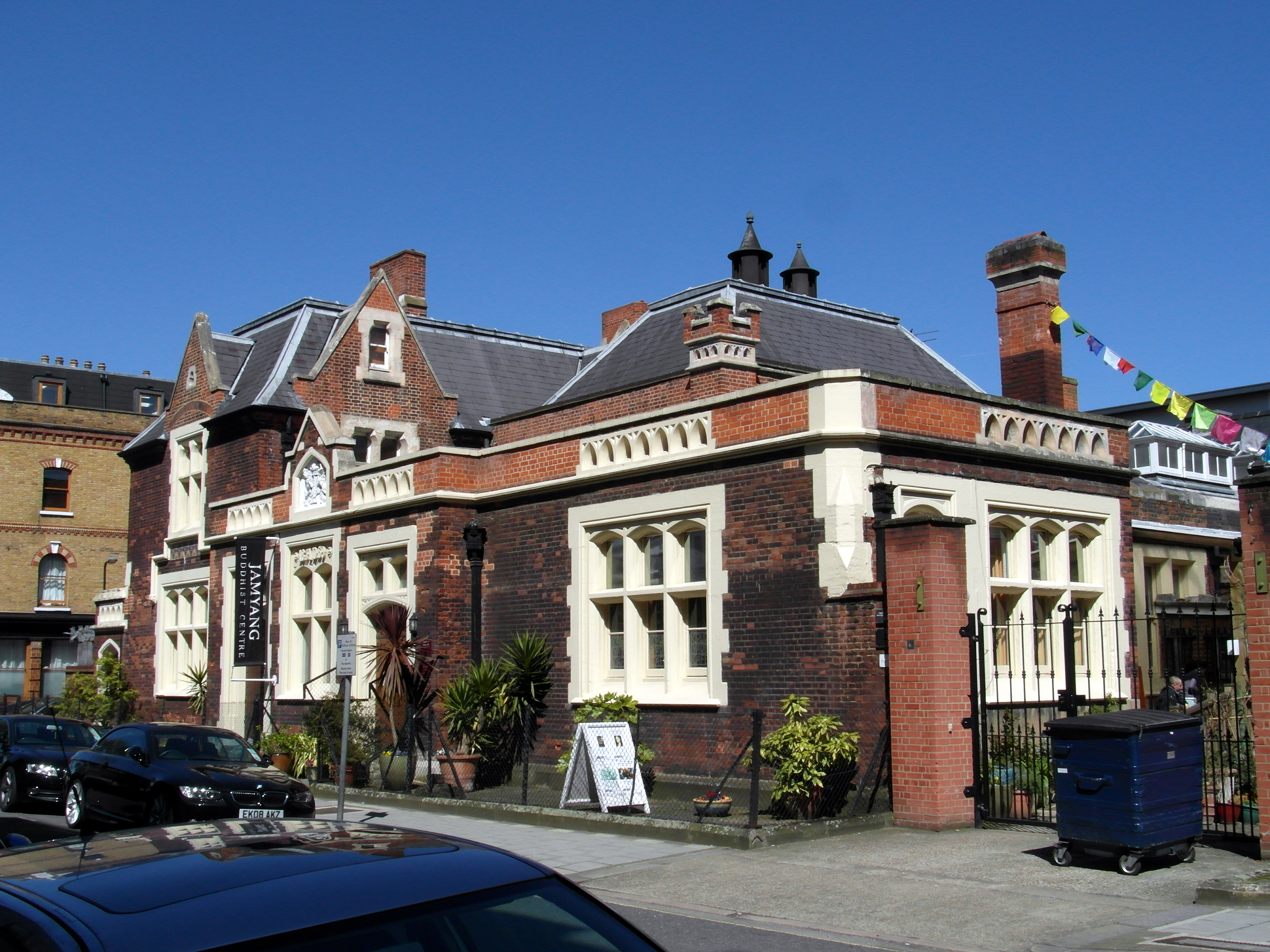
Lambeth Magistrates' Court

Lambeth Magistrates' Court is a former magistrates' court building in Renfrew Road, Kennington SE11, in the London Borough of Lambeth. It was originally known as Lambeth Police Court. It is now home to the Jamyang Buddhist Centre.

It is a Grade II-listed building, built in 1869 and designed by Thomas Charles Sorby in the Gothic Revival style.

It is "the earliest surviving example of a Criminal Magistrates Court in the Metropolitan area".
