= Victimless crime =

Concept in criminology

A victimless crime is an illegal act that typically either directly involves only the perpetrator or occurs between consenting individuals. Because it is consensual in nature, whether there involves a victim is a matter of debate. Definitions of victimless crimes vary in different parts of the world and different law systems, but usually include possession of any illegal contraband, recreational drug use, prostitution and prohibited sexual behavior, assisted suicide, and smuggling among other similar infractions.

In politics, a lobbyist or an activist might use the term victimless crime with the implication that the law in question should be abolished.

Victimless crimes are, in the harm principle of John Stuart Mill, "victimless" from a position that considers the individual as the sole sovereign, to the exclusion of more abstract bodies such as a community or a state against which criminal offenses may be directed. They may be considered offenses against the state rather than society.

== Definition ==
According to the University of Chicago's vice scholar, Jim Leitzel, three characteristics can be used to identify whether a crime is a victimless crime: if the act is excessive, is indicative of a distinct pattern of behavior, and its adverse effects impact only the person who has engaged in it.

== Examples ==
Many victimless crimes begin because of a desire to obtain illegal products or services that are in high demand. Criminal penalties thus tend to limit the supply more than the demand, driving up the black-market price and creating monopoly profits for those criminals who remain in business. This "crime tariff" encourages the growth of sophisticated and well-organized criminal groups. Organized crime in turn tends to diversify into other areas of crime. Large profits provide ample funds for bribery of public officials, as well as capital for diversification.

The war on drugs is a commonly cited example of prosecution of victimless crime. The reasoning behind this is that drug use does not directly harm other people. One argument is that the criminalization of drugs leads to highly inflated prices for drugs. For example, Bedau and Schur found in 1974 that "In England the pharmacy cost of heroin [was] 0.06 cents per grain. In the United States street price [was] $30–90 per grain." This inflation in price is believed to drive addicts to commit crimes such as theft and robbery, which are thought to be inherently damaging to society, in order to be able to purchase the drugs on which they are dependent.

In addition to the creation of a black market for drugs, the war on drugs is argued by proponents of legalization to reduce the workforce by damaging the ability of those convicted to find work. It is reasoned that this reduction of the workforce is ultimately harmful to an economy reliant on labor. The number of drug arrests increases every year. In a poll taken by the Bureau of Justice Statistics between 1980 and 2009, "[over a] 30-year period...[arrest] rates for drug possession or use doubled for whites and tripled for blacks."

According to economist Walter Block, illegal immigration and emigration is a victimless crime from a libertarian perspective.

Vera Bergelson states that victimless crime comes in four main varieties:

1. An act that does not harm others (suicide, drug use, unemployment)
2. A transaction between consenting adults that does not harm others (assisted suicide, gambling, prostitution)
3. An act whose consequences are borne by society at large (tax evasion, insider trading)
4. Actions which are banned due to being considered immoral (homosexual sex, flag burning)

== Legalization of victimless acts ==
Many activities that were once considered crimes are no longer illegal in some countries, at least in part because of their status as victimless crimes.

One example is the British sturdy beggar laws that applied the death penalty to unemployment.

Two large categories of victimless crimes are sexual pleasure and recreational drug use (drug pleasure). On the first,

- Homosexual sex has been legalized in many countries, the first one being France in 1791.
- Other sexual matters considered victimless crimes and proposed for legalization include consensual adult incest and sexting by teenagers (considered child pornography).

Marijuana use is forbidden by law in Australia but is the most "widely used illicit drug" in the country, just as it is in countries such as the United States and New Zealand. Prohibition of alcohol in the United States, repealed in 1933, is considered a failed "social experiment" because many citizens ignored what it stipulated, turning to home-made spirits in lieu of licensed alcoholic drinks and resultantly making problems worse. In the United States today, tension over marijuana legalization is in response to the current marijuana prohibition in most states, but there are efforts to legalize cannabis in many countries such as the United States and Australia, as its legalization has the potential to greatly increase revenue.

Prostitution is legal in many countries, though usually restricted. The Netherlands legalized prostitution in 1999, and was one of the first countries to do so. As of 2012, however, it has been considering policy changes to severely restrict it.

Adultery (sexual acts between a married person and a person other than the spouse) and fornication (sexual acts between unmarried people) have not been prosecuted in the United States for over 50 years, although the laws against them, like those against sodomy, are still on the books in several states. However, because sodomy laws were struck down as unconstitutional by the U.S. Supreme Court in Lawrence v. Texas, the laws against fornication would also be unconstitutional as was recognized by the Supreme Court of Virginia in Martin v. Ziherl.

== Controversy ==
A major concern among opponents of legalizing victimless crimes is the degradation of societal moral standards, but punishing citizens for their choice to engage in victimless acts declared by the law to be immoral is difficult. While the United States's typical response to crimes is retroactive, the illegality of victimless crimes is a more preventative approach to justice and is highly controversial.

Controversies over victimless crime deal mostly with the question of whether a crime can ever actually be victimless. With relation to drugs and their pathway to consumption, the impact of the drug trade and liability laws on drug dealers, their families, and other unforeseen actors may end in victimization. Another act often considered a victimless crime is the possession of pornography, especially fictional child pornography. However, those who hold this position typically acknowledge the victimization that can occur to performers during production of non-fictional pornography.

Preventative law, such as sex offender registries and anti-social behavior orders, blurs the distinction between criminal and civil law because victimless crime is typically difficult to categorize and criminalize. This is problematic because it causes a distortion of traditional procedures of the criminal and civil of aspects of law by enabling confusion and procedural interchangeability.

== See also ==
- Anti-homelessness legislation
- Consensual crime
- Decriminalization
- Drug liberalization
- Drug prohibition
- Freedom of speech
- Freedom of thought
- Freedom to roam
- Illegal drug trade
- Illegalism
- Jury nullification
- Legality of cannabis
- Legality of euthanasia
- Public-order crime
- Status offence
- Suicide legislation
- Thoughtcrime
