= R v Coney =

English case that ended bare-knuckle fighting

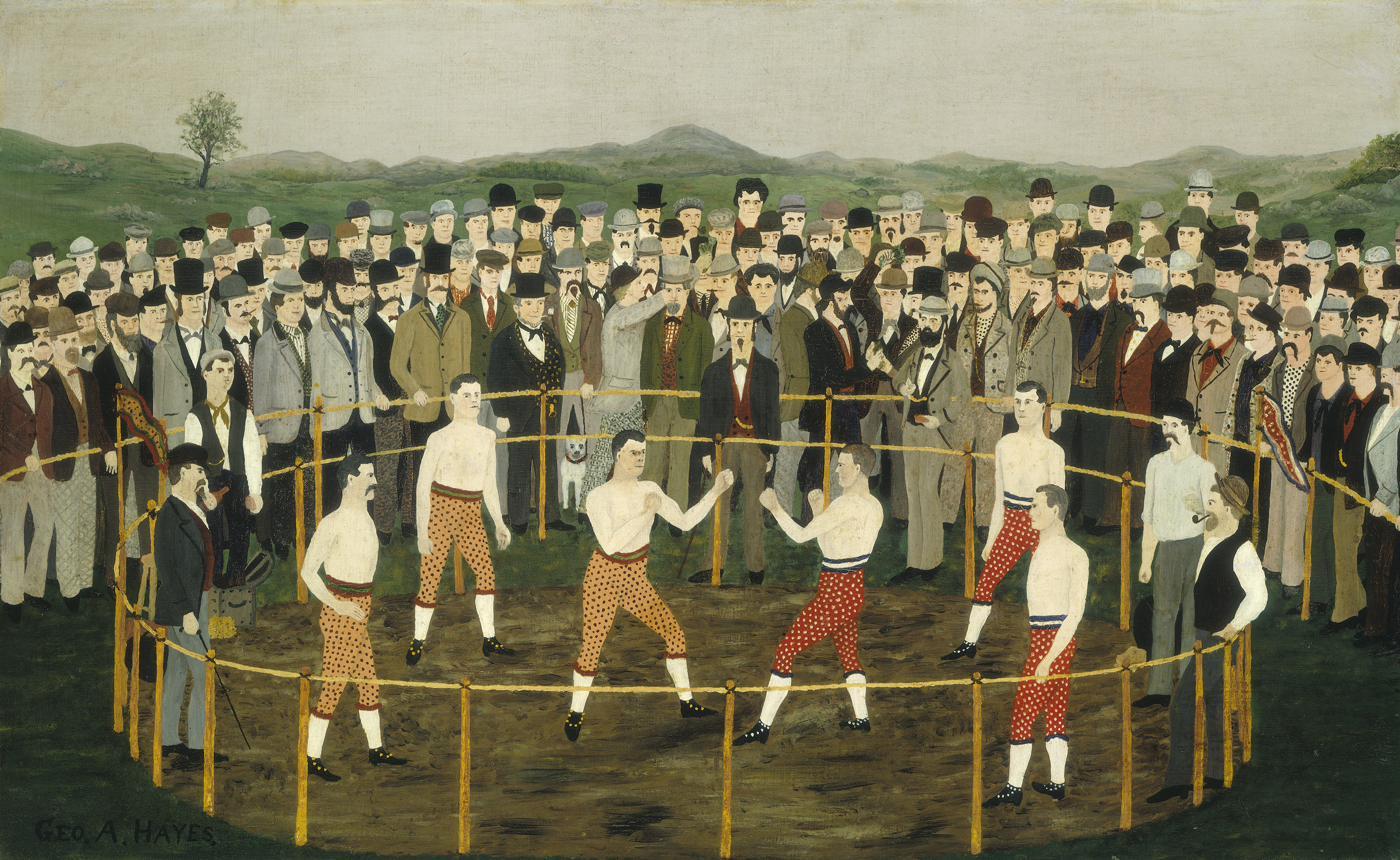
- Court: Queen's Bench Division
- Full case name: The Queen v Coney and others
- Decided: 1882
- Citation: 8 QBD 534 (Divisional Court)

Case history
- Prior actions: Referral from magistrates' court (certifying they were uncertain in law as to their decision); Divisional Court in turn referred matter to Crown Cases Reserved (drawing on a larger panel of judges)
- Subsequent action: none

Court membership
- Judges sitting: Lord Coleridge, Chief Justice, Messieurs Justices Cave, Mathew, Stephens, Lopes, North, Hawkins, Manisty, Denman, Baron Huddleston, Baron Pollock

Keywords
- Actual bodily harm; brutal sport; propensity to result in actual or grievous bodily harm; prize-fighting; bare-knuckle fighting in public place

R v Coney (1882) 8 QBD 534 is an English case in which the Court for Crown Cases Reserved found that a bare-knuckle fight was an assault occasioning actual bodily harm, despite the consent of the participants. This marked the end of widespread public bare-knuckle contests in England.

The case also found that voluntary attendance as a spectator was evidence that could be put to the jury to support a charge of aiding and abetting the assault. It was found however that an ordinary citizen is not under any duty to prevent an offence being committed and that failing to prevent it does not create liability as an accomplice.

== Application ==
The principles laid down have been applied or nuanced (distinguished) in consensual crime precedents. See R v Brown for a selection of scenarios in which the prohibition of actual bodily harm applies and where, for example in running the risk of ABH in less risky sports, it does not.

== Judges ==
- John Coleridge, 1st Baron Coleridge

== See also ==
- English criminal law
- R v Clarkson (David) [1971]
