= People v. Jovanovic =

Criminal case in New York

- Seal of New York
- Court: New York Supreme Court, Appellate Division, First Department
- Full case name: The People of the State of New York, v. Oliver Jovanovic
- Decided: 2001
- Citations: 263 A.D.2d 182, 700 N.Y.S.2d 156 (NY Appellate Div., 1st Dept. 1999)

Court membership
- Judge sitting: William Wetzel

Case opinions
- The trial court's evidentiary rulings incorrectly applied the Rape Shield Law and, as a result, improperly hampered defendant's ability to present a defense, requiring reversal of his conviction and remand for a new trial.

People v. Jovanovic, 263 A.D.2d 182, 700 N.Y.S.2d 156 (N.Y. App. Div. 1st Dep't 1999), was a highly publicized criminal case in New York. In 1996, Oliver Jovanovic (born 1966) was accused of sadomasochistic torture of a woman, later identified as Jamie Rzucek, whom he had met shortly before on the Internet. He was convicted in 1998 and the conviction was overturned on appeal in 1999 because parts of email messages between the two had been improperly excluded as evidence at trial. Rzucek declined to testify during the retrial in 2001 and the case was dropped.

== The incident ==
In the summer of 1996, Rzucek (then a 20-year-old student at Barnard College), made the acquaintance of Jovanovic (then a graduate student in microbiology at Columbia University) in an internet chat room. They exchanged several email messages and talked on the telephone. In the messages, Jovanovic mentioned Joel-Peter Witkin's photographs of corpses, and Rzucek expressed her interest in snuff films.

On November 22, the two met for a dinner date and then went to Jovanovic's apartment, where they watched a Meet the Feebles video. Rzucek later alleged that then she was held there against her will for 20 hours, bound and gagged, sodomized and tortured in various ways. Jovanovic maintained that the acts were consensual.

The two exchanged further emails after the event, with Rzucek describing her state at one point as "quite bruised mentally and physically, but never been so happy to be alive" and "the taste is so overpoweringly delicious, and at the same time, quite nauseating" (using a phrase from William S. Burroughs' Naked Lunch). Shortly thereafter, Rzucek talked to family and friends about the incident, and a few weeks later she filed a complaint with the police. Police determined that the allegations did not merit charges, but Linda Fairstein, then head of the sex-crime division of Manhattan's District Attorney's office, decided to press charges after speaking to Rzucek.

== Legal case ==
After a jury trial during which Rzucek testified for six days, Jovanovic was convicted and sentenced to 15 years to life for kidnapping, sexual abuse and assault. Shortly before the jury's verdict, Jovanovic had refused a plea bargain offered by the prosecution. Jovanovic served 20 months in prison during which a fellow prisoner harmed Jovanovic in his neck area.

=== Family reactions ===
Rzucek's grandmother, Fay Webster, related to news media how her granddaughter had a notorious history of lying and fabricating: "We know her well, and we know what she said about Oliver was just another of her fabrications. She has made false accusations before, and this is another one of them", Webster claimed. She went on to describe her granddaughter as "a very cold person", saying that Rzucek had "caused a lot of trouble in other people's lives by her lying." "Enough is enough", she added. "I think the Manhattan District Attorney's Office should drop the case."

=== Release and overturning ===
On December 20, 1999, Jovanovic was released from prison when the New York appeals court ruled in a 40-page majority opinion by Appellate Justice David Saxe that the state's rape shield law had been misapplied by the judge in charge of the case, then Acting Justice William Wetzel. The appellate court determined that the parts of Rzucek's emails in which she writes about her sadomasochistic interests and experiences should not have been excluded from examination. In one such message she describes herself as a "pushy bottom" (a submissive person who pushes the dominant partner to do what the bottom wants) and in another as the slave of her sadomasochistic boyfriend. Had the improperly excluded emails been entered into evidence, Rzucek could have been rigorously cross-examined on their contents.

In July 2000 it was announced that New York's highest court affirmed the appellate court's decision, refusing to reinstate Jovanovic's conviction. In response, the Manhattan district attorney's office announced that it would retry him. Jovanovic, upon learning of the city's intentions, called it "a case of vindictiveness". He became further outraged upon learning that Wetzel would again preside over the retrial. "I will never admit to a crime I didn't commit," Jovanovic declared as he refused to accept another plea deal.

All charges against Jovanovic were finally dropped on November 1, 2001, when his accuser refused to testify during the 2001 retrial. Jovanovic's lawyer, Paul F. Callan, claimed to have compiled a list of witnesses against Rzucek that included former boyfriends and other people who could testify about her involvement in sadomasochistic relationships. "[S]he knew her lie would be exposed," Callan said, and that being subjected to "facing the reality" of the list of witnesses he had compiled would have proved "too much for her."

Jovanovic stated that it would be his intention to complete his doctorate in microbiology, which he did with honors.

=== Aftermath ===
In October 2004, Jovanovic filed a civil suit against New York City, claiming that the false allegations had harmed his reputation and that prosecutors had had knowledge of previous false accusations of sexual abuse. The suit also named prosecutor Linda Fairstein, who had become a millionaire from her best-selling crime novels. Jovanovic had stirred up controversy earlier by implying that Fairstein's handling of the case was motivated by a desire to profit from the so-called "cyberfiend" trial, using his real-life court case as inspiration for a new novel. "I think she's profiteering from her position and turned it into a consumer entity," Jovanovic said during a news conference a month after his case was first overturned on appeal. Jovanovic accused Fairstein of being an "opportunist" only concerned about making money and a name for herself: "It's actually quite terrifying," he said, "to realize that a prosecutor ... bent on convicting you regardless of guilt or innocence can do so with the support of a judge, that makes rulings in their favor." In a separate interview that same month, Jovanovic said he thought Fairstein was "looking for a high-profile case" like his that she could milk for a story idea, and that his case also benefited from having an "internet" angle attached to it, "which was fairly new at the time."

In August 2006 a Manhattan federal judge rejected the city's motion to dismiss the $10 million suit.

In August 2009 Jovanovic added to his court papers the claim that Rzucek's psychologist "engaged in some sort of sadomasochistic activity ... which explains the physical injuries apparent on [her] body when she went to the cops."

In September 2010 the civil suit was dismissed.
