= R v Brown =

UK House of Lords case

- Court: House of Lords
- Decided: 11 March 1993
- Citations: [1993] UKHL 19; [1994] 1 AC 212; [1993] 2 WLR 556; [1993] 2 All ER 75; (1993) 97 Cr App R 44

Case history
- Prior actions: Conviction in the Crown Court (defence ruled out by judge; guilty pleas); Conviction upheld by the Court of Appeal of England and Wales

Keywords
- Assault occasioning actual bodily harm; Malicious wounding; Consent

R v Brown [1993] UKHL 19, [1994] 1 AC 212 is a House of Lords judgment that confirmed the conviction of five men for consensual sadomasochistic acts over a ten-year period. The men were convicted of unlawful and malicious wounding and assault occasioning actual bodily harm under sections 20 and 47 of the Offences Against the Person Act 1861. The central question was whether consent could be a valid defence to assault in these circumstances. The Court held it could not.

The case is known colloquially as the Spanner case, after Operation Spanner, the police investigation that uncovered the activities.

== Background ==
The five appellants engaged in severe sadomasochistic sexual acts, consenting to the harm they received. They also sought to have their mutually consented acts viewed as lawful. Police discovered the acts during an unrelated investigation. None of the five men complained about the activities.

The physical severity was undisputed. The acts included nailing parts of the body to a board, though this did not require medical treatment. Each appellant pleaded guilty after the trial judge ruled that consent was no defence.

== Legal question ==
The House of Lords considered this certified question:

Where A wounds or assaults B occasioning him actual bodily harm in the course of a sadomasochistic encounter, does the prosecution have to prove lack of consent on the part of B before they can establish A's guilt under section 20 or section 47 of the Offences Against the Person Act 1861?

The appellants argued their consent should be a defence (volenti non fit injuria), comparing their acts to lawful exceptions like tattooing and body piercings.

== Judgment ==
The Lords answered the certified question in the negative by a bare majority (three to two). Consent could not be a defence to these offences.

=== Majority view ===
Lord Templeman stated that society was entitled and bound to protect itself against a cult of violence. He found pleasure from inflicting pain to be evil and cruelty uncivilised. He examined the acts as "unpredictably dangerous and degrading to body and mind" and found they "were developed with increasing barbarity".

Lord Jauncey concluded that the infliction of bodily harm without good reason is unlawful and the victim's consent is irrelevant. He drew the line between common law assault and assault occasioning actual bodily harm, holding that consent is no defence to the latter unless the circumstances fall within recognised exceptions like organised sports, parental chastisement, or reasonable surgery.

Lord Jauncey raised concerns about the risk of corruption of young men and questioned the need for video recordings if the only purpose was sexual gratification. He stated that if Parliament wished to declare such activities lawful, it should do so explicitly.

Lord Lowry agreed with Lord Templeman and Lord Jauncey. He argued that deliberate and painful infliction of physical injury should not be exempted from statutory provisions designed to prevent that very thing. He stated that sadomasochistic activity cannot be regarded as contributing to family life or society's welfare and that relaxation of prohibitions would only encourage the practice.

On the European Convention on Human Rights, Lord Lowry noted that Article 8 was not part of English law (this is no longer the case; see Human Rights Act 1998) and that no public authority interfered with any right by enforcing the 1861 Act.

=== Dissenting view ===
Lord Mustill preferred that consensual, private sexual acts, including those involving actual bodily harm, should remain outside criminal law. He stated the case should be about the criminal law of private sexual relations and that neither repugnance nor moral objection were proper grounds for creating a new crime.

Lord Slynn agreed with Lord Mustill. He noted that consent is generally a defence to battery, subject to exceptions. He concluded that adults can consent to acts done in private that do not result in serious bodily harm. In his view, the prosecution must prove the person did not consent. He would have allowed the appeals and set aside the convictions.

== Academic and legal response ==
Legal journals and textbooks of the twenty-first century tend to criticise the majority's analysis and reasoning.

Baker argues that while sadomasochistic activities require repeated harm to achieve sexual gratification (unlike one-off procedures like tattooing), the argument should not apply to actual bodily harm. Those who regularly inflict actual bodily harm on themselves through smoking or excessive drinking are not criminalised, nor are professional athletes who regularly subject their bodies to such harm.

Marianne Giles calls the judgment "paternalism of an unelected, unrepresentative group who use but fail to acknowledge that power".

Opposition to the judgment focuses on the dissenting judges' views and the contrasting case of R v Wilson, where a husband branded his initials on his wife's buttocks at her request. Fears of bias due to heteronormativity were addressed in R v Emmett, where the Court of Appeal held the same rules apply to heterosexual participants in such acts.

Fox and Thomson (2005), citing R v Brown, argue against non-therapeutic circumcision of boys.

== Related cases ==
- K. A. v Belgium
- Laskey, Jaggard and Brown v United Kingdom
- R v BM
- R v Coney (1882)
- R v Donovan [1934]
- R v Hobday
- R v Wilson [1996]
- R v Gustavson and others

== See also ==
- Operation Spanner
- Consent (criminal law)
- Offences Against the Person Act 1861
