= Boston Borough Council elections =

Local government elections in Lincolnshire, England

Boston Borough Council in Lincolnshire, England is elected every four years. Since the last boundary changes in 2015, 30 councillors are elected from 15 wards.

== Council elections ==
- 1973 Boston Borough Council election
- 1976 Boston Borough Council election
- 1979 Boston Borough Council election (New ward boundaries)
- 1983 Boston Borough Council election
- 1987 Boston Borough Council election
- 1991 Boston Borough Council election
- 1995 Boston Borough Council election
- 1999 Boston Borough Council election (New ward boundaries reduced the number of seats by two)
- 2003 Boston Borough Council election
- 2007 Boston Borough Council election
- 2011 Boston Borough Council election
- 2015 Boston Borough Council election (New ward boundaries reduced the number of seats by two)
- 2019 Boston Borough Council election
- 2023 Boston Borough Council election

== Election results ==
	Overall control	Conservative	Labour	Lib Dems	UKIP	English Democrats	Boston Bypass Independents	Boston Independent	Blue Revolution	Independent
2023	Boston Independent	5	0	1	0	0	0	18	1	5
2019	Conservative	16	2	0	1	0	0	0	0	11
2015	NOC	13	2	0	13	0	0	0	0	2
2011	Conservative	19	3	0	0	2	4	0	0	4
2007	Boston Bypass Independents	5	0	0	0	0	25	0	0	2
2003	NOC	12	11	4	0	0	0	0	0	5

== Borough result maps ==
2003 results map

2007 results map

2011 results map

2015 results map

2019 results map

2023 results map

== By-election results ==
=== 1995-1999 ===
Swineshead By-Election 27 February 1997
Party	Candidate	Votes	%	±%
Independent		495	57.5	
Independent		142	16.5	
Liberal Democrats		118	13.7	
Labour		106	12.3	
Majority		353	41.0	
Turnout		861		
Independent hold		Swing		

Kirton By-Election 11 December 1997
Party	Candidate	Votes	%	±%
Conservative		363	59.0	
Labour		252	41.0	
Majority		111	18.0	
Turnout		615		
Conservative gain from Independent		Swing		

West By-Election 2 July 1998
Party	Candidate	Votes	%	±%
Conservative		580	66.8	
Labour		288	33.2	
Majority		292	33.6	
Turnout		868		
Conservative gain from Liberal Democrats		Swing		

=== 1999-2003 ===
Kirton By-Election 17 February 2000
Party	Candidate	Votes	%	±%
Conservative		181	34.3	
Liberal Democrats		158	30.0	
Independent		141	26.8	
Labour		47	8.9	
Majority		23	4.3	
Turnout		527	19.2	
Conservative gain from Independent		Swing		

Pilgrim By-Election 26 October 2000
Party	Candidate	Votes	%	±%
Conservative		116	43.3	
Labour		96	35.8	
Liberal Democrats		33	12.3	
Independent		23	8.6	
Majority		20	7.5	
Turnout		268	19.8	
Conservative gain from Labour		Swing		

South By-Election 22 February 2001
Party	Candidate	Votes	%	±%
Conservative		182	38.1	
Labour		149	31.2	
Liberal Democrats		147	30.8	
Majority		33	6.9	
Turnout		478	32.7	
Conservative hold		Swing		

=== 2003-2007 ===
Staniland South By-Election 1 April 2004
Party	Candidate	Votes	%	±%
Labour		330	46.0	
Conservative		251	35.0	
Independent		137	19.1	
Majority		79	11.0	
Turnout		718	26.9	
Labour hold		Swing		

Fishtoft By-Election 14 July 2005
Party	Candidate	Votes	%	±%
Labour	Michael Gall	316	33.1	+16.6
Liberal Democrats	Robert Dodson	310	32.5	+0.9
Conservative	Terence Taylor	254	26.6	−25.3
UKIP	Don Ransome	75	7.8	+7.8
Majority		6	0.6	
Turnout		955	20.5	
Labour gain from Conservative		Swing		

Kirton By-Election 2 February 2006
Party	Candidate	Votes	%	±%
Conservative	John Rylatt	505	72.8	+30.5
Labour	Catrina Holstead	104	15.0	−2.5
Independent	John Fitzgerald	85	12.2	−28.0
Majority		401	57.8	
Turnout		694	20.6	
Conservative hold		Swing		

Old Leake & Wrangle By-Election 6 April 2006
Party	Candidate	Votes	%	±%
Conservative	Frank Pickett	366	55.2	−12.8
UKIP	Sue Ransome	115	17.3	+2.6
Labour	Clive Marshall	99	14.9	+14.9
Liberal Democrats	Paul Appleby	83	12.5	+12.5
Majority		251	37.9	
Turnout		663	25.5	
Conservative hold		Swing		

Fishtoft By-Election 6 July 2006
Party	Candidate	Votes	%	±%
Conservative	Raymond Singleton-McGuire	495	44.7	+6.8
Liberal Democrats	Malcolm Chapman	428	38.7	−2.1
UKIP	John Flynn	184	16.6	+16.6
Majority		67	6.0	
Turnout		1,107	23.6	
Conservative hold		Swing		

=== 2007-2011 ===
Coastal By-Election 24 July 2008
Party	Candidate	Votes	%	±%
Conservative	Raymond Singleton-McGuire	344	30.9	−1.6
Boston Bypass Independents	David Durrant	306	27.5	−32.9
Liberal Democrats	Ossy Snell	213	19.1	+19.1
BNP	David Owens	119	10.7	+10.7
UKIP	Felicity Ransome	88	7.9	+0.7
Labour	Pam Imlah	44	3.9	+3.9
Majority		38	3.4	
Turnout		1,114	37.3	−4.5
Conservative gain from Boston Bypass Independents		Swing		

Fenside By-Election 13 November 2008
Party	Candidate	Votes	%	±%
BNP	David Owens	279	42.6	+42.6
Boston Bypass Independents	Carl Smith	141	21.5	−21.8
Conservative	Paul Mould	119	18.2	−0.1
Labour	Norman Hart	69	10.5	−13.2
UKIP	Cyril Wakefield	24	3.7	−11.0
Liberal Democrats	Gavin Carrington	23	3.5	+3.5
Majority		138	21.1	
Turnout		655	22.1	−0.5
BNP gain from Boston Bypass Independents		Swing		

Kirton By-Election 4 June 2009
Party	Candidate	Votes	%	±%
Conservative	Colin Brotherton	490	42.2	+8.9
Boston Bypass Independents	Carl Smith	243	20.9	−45.7
UKIP	Sue Ransome	230	19.8	+19.8
Independent	Frank Martin	122	13.1	+13.1
Labour	Elizabeth Leonard	75	6.5	+6.5
Majority		247	21.3	
Turnout		1,160	31.7	+0.9
Conservative hold		Swing		

Pilgrim By-Election 4 June 2009
Party	Candidate	Votes	%	±%
Conservative	Myles Larrington	110	32.4	−16.7
Labour	Paul Kenny	76	22.4	+13.0
UKIP	Felicity Ransome	59	17.4	+17.4
Boston Bypass Independents	Trevor Page	53	15.6	−26.1
Liberal Democrats	Mike Sheridan-Shinn	42	12.4	+12.4
Majority		34	10.0	
Turnout		340	27.4	+0.3
Conservative hold		Swing		

=== 2011-2015 ===
Frampton and Holme By-Election 18 October 2012
Party	Candidate	Votes	%	±%
Independent	Stuart Ashton	204	39.2	−17.8
Independent	Maggie Peberdy	139	26.7	−2.2
Conservative	Claire Rylott	126	24.2	+24.2
UKIP	Sue Ransome	32	6.2	−7.9
Labour	Mike Sheridan-Shinn	19	3.7	+3.7
Majority		65	12.5	
Turnout		520	35.6	−13.2
Independent hold		Swing		

Staniland South By-Election 2 May 2013
Party	Candidate	Votes	%	±%
UKIP	Bob Mcauley	376	44.4	+44.4
Labour Co-op	Pam Kenny	202	23.8	−2.5
Independent	Robert Lauberts	145	17.1	+17.1
Conservative	Carl Richmond	124	14.6	−16.3
Majority		174	20.6	
Turnout		847	29.9	−5.4
UKIP gain from Conservative		Swing		

Fenside By-Election 5 September 2013
Party	Candidate	Votes	%	±%
UKIP	Tiggs Keywood-Wainwright	162	39.4	+39.4
Conservative	Dan Elkington	87	21.2	+21.2
Liberal Democrats	Alan Taylor	87	21.2	+11.4
Labour	Ben Cook	75	18.2	−8.0
Majority		75	18.2	
Turnout		411	13.7	−11.2
UKIP gain from English Democrat		Swing		

=== 2015-2019 ===
Old Leake and Wrangle By-Election 22 February 2018
Party	Candidate	Votes	%	±%
Conservative	Tom Ashton	536	74.2	+21.3
Labour	Joseph Pearson	123	17.0	+17.0
UKIP	Don Ransome	50	6.9	−40.2
Blue Revolution	Richard Thornalley	13	1.8	+1.8
Majority		413	57.2	
Turnout		722		
Conservative hold		Swing		

=== 2019-2023 ===
Kirton and Frampton By-Election 12 December 2019
Party	Candidate	Votes	%	±%
Conservative	David Brown	2,018	69.9	+35.7
Independent	Lorraine O'Connor	453	15.7	+15.7
Liberal Democrats	Alan Taylor	415	14.4	+14.4
Majority		1,565	54.2	
Turnout		2,886		
Conservative hold		Swing		

Skirbeck By-Election 12 December 2019
Party	Candidate	Votes	%	±%
Conservative	Martin Howard	955	51.3	+27.3
Labour	Jackie Barton	437	23.5	+2.0
Independent	Don Jenkins	195	10.5	+10.5
Independent	Sue Ransome	112	6.0	+6.0
Liberal Democrats	Jason Stevenson	100	5.4	+5.4
Blue Revolution	Christopher Moore	62	3.3	−11.2
Majority		518	27.8	
Turnout		1,861		
Conservative hold		Swing		

Skirbeck By-Election 6 May 2021
Party	Candidate	Votes	%	±%
Conservative	Katie Chalmers	338	34.5	+10.5
Independent	Dale Broughton	307	31.4	+31.4
Labour	Jackie Barton	210	21.5	+0.0
For the People Not the Party	Christopher Moore	88	9.0	+9.0
Independent	Christopher Cardwell	36	3.7	+3.7
Majority		31	3.2	
Turnout		979		
Conservative gain from Independent		Swing		

=== 2023-2027 ===
Trinity By-Election 1 May 2025
Party	Candidate	Votes	%	±%
Reform UK	Jonathan Noble	388	39.2	
Boston Independent	Shafqat Bashir	277	28.0	
Conservative	Katie Chalmers	237	24.0	
Green	Jonathan Wolf	76	7.7	
Blue Revolution	Richard Thornalley	11	1.1	
Majority		111	11.2	
Turnout		989		
Reform UK gain from Boston Independent		Swing		
