= Healthcare in Worcestershire =

Healthcare in Worcestershire was the responsibility of three Clinical Commissioning Groups until July 2022, covering, respectively Redditch and Bromsgrove, Wyre Forest and South Worcestershire.

== History ==
From 1947 to 1974, NHS services in Worcestershire were managed by the Birmingham Regional Hospital Board. In 1974 the boards were abolished and replaced by regional health authorities. Worcestershire still came under the Birmingham RHA. Regions were reorganised in 1996 and Worcestershire came under the West Midlands Regional Health Authority. From 1974 there were two area health authorities covering the county: Worcester and District, and Hereford and Worcester. There were three primary care trusts established in the county in 2002: Redditch and Bromsgrove PCT, South Worcestershire PCT and Wyre Forest PCT. They were managed by the West Mercia Strategic health authority which merged into West Midlands Strategic Health Authority in 2006 when the PCTs were merged into Worcestershire PCT.

The closure of the Accident and Emergency department at Kidderminster Hospital by Worcestershire Health Authority in 2000 spurred Dr Richard Taylor to stand for Parliament as an Independent Kidderminster Hospital and Health Concern candidate at the 2001 general election, Taylor campaigned largely on a single issue, that of restoring the Accident & Emergency department. He was elected with a majority of 18,000, defeating the incumbent Labour MP and junior minister, David Lock. His success, which became known as the Kidderminster effect, inhibited subsequent hospital reorganisations.

== Sustainability and transformation plan ==
Herefordshire and Worcestershire formed a sustainability and transformation plan area in March 2016 with Sarah Dugan, the Chief Executive of Worcestershire Health and Care NHS Trust, as its leader In March 2018 it was announced that Simon Trickett would become the new accountable officer for all four CCGs from May 2018.

== Commissioning ==
There are about 570,000 residents in the county, 19% aged over 65, compared with 16% across England. The annual health budget is about £900m, more than half of which goes to Worcestershire Acute Hospitals NHS Trust. The three CCGs announced in March 2016 that they were facing a collective deficit of £25 million in 2016/7 and were considering restricting access to a range of treatments. The list of treatments under consideration includes:

- Physiotherapy for minor injuries
- Knee and hip replacements
- Hearing aids for people with mild hearing loss
- Chiropody not associated with long term conditions such as diabetes
- IVF
- Gluten free foods on prescription
- "Over the counter" medicines for short term minor conditions
- Cataract surgery for people with mild vision difficulties
- Vasectomies and female sterilisation
- Some treatments for patients with "unhealthy lifestyles"
- "Non health essential treatments" (for example conditions such as excessive sweating and erectile dysfunction)
- Procedures which have "limited medical benefit (such as treating hernias and removing tonsils")

Hereford and Worcestershire was one of the four areas chosen to trial the integration of specialised commissioning, previously run by NHS England centrally, in September 2016.

The four Clinical Commissioning Groups, South Worcestershire, Redditch and Bromsgrove, Wyre Forest, and Herefordshire are to merge in 2020.

== Primary care ==
Before they were stautuorily abolished in July 2022, there were 22 GP practices in Redditch and Bromsgrove Clinical Commissioning Group, 12 in Wyre Forest Clinical Commissioning Group and 32 in South Worcestershire Clinical Commissioning Group.

The Care Quality Commission released its Intelligent Monitoring database, the first stage in the quality monitoring process for primary care in November 2014. All but two practices in the city of Worcester were ranked in band six, the highest quality. Peter Pinfield, chairman Healthwatch Worcestershire said "By and large I think in Worcestershire we rank very highly".

== Community care and mental health ==
Palliative care is provided by Acorns Children's Hospice. The main provider of NHS mental health services is Worcestershire Health and Care NHS Trust. According to the trust’s clinical director for older adult mental health Dr Bernie Coope, about 8,500 people in Worcestershire – 3.4% of the entire population were living with dementia, and this figure was increasing by 3% each year, as per a news report in March 2015.

== Acute care ==
Hospital care in the county is provided by the Worcestershire Acute Hospitals NHS Trust. More specialist provision comes mostly from hospital services in Birmingham. The Acute Trust runs three hospitals in Worcester, Redditch, and Kidderminster. Between them, they provide two emergency departments, one paediatric inpatient units and two obstetric departments at Worcester Royal Hospital and Alexandra Hospital. In 2015, the Trust and the Clinical Commissioning Groups agreed that this provision was not sustainable. The trust faces a funding gap of up to £200 million by 2015-16. There were also concerns about quality and safety because of difficulties recruiting consultants in some specialities. Proposals to reorganise services to concentrate specialities on one site or the other were under consideration but public consultation was postponed until after the 2015 General Election.

Worcestershire Acute Hospitals NHS Trust opened a new cancer treatment unit which has three linear accelerators in January 2015, in partnership with University Hospitals Coventry and Warwickshire NHS Trust. It hoped to treat about 1,500 patients per year who previously had to travel for radiotherapy. It was also intended to extend the chemotherapy services available on the site.

In September 2015 Redditch and Bromsgrove Clinical Commissioning Group asked local GPs not to refer patients to Worcestershire Acute Hospitals NHS Trust over the next three months because the Trust was unable to treat patients within 18 weeks of referral. Waiting times were out of control in ear, nose and throat, trauma and orthopaedics, gynaecology, general surgery and dermatology. 2,347 patients had waited more than 18 weeks.

It was decided in July 2017, to move all hospital births, inpatients children's services and emergency surgery across the county to Worcestershire Royal. A lot of planned orthopaedic surgery will be moved from Worcestershire Royal to Redditch and some day case and short stay surgery moved to Kidderminster Hospital.

== Healthwatch ==
Healthwatch Worcestershire, an organisation set up under the Health and Social Care Act 2012 to act as a voice for patients, carried out a survey of the use of the Alexandra Hospital in Redditch. They found that 31,613 people had attended the hospital's A&E department between April and December 2014: up 4.3% on the previous 12 months, with nearly a fifth of those coming from areas outside of Worcestershire including South Birmingham who were using the service as an alternative to the Queen Elizabeth Hospital Birmingham.

== See also ==
- Category:Health in Worcestershire
