= Worcestershire Acute Hospitals NHS Trust =

NHS hospital trust

- Type: NHS Trust
- Established: 1 April 2000
- Region served: Worcestershire
- Establishments: 4
- Hospitals: Worcestershire Royal Hospital; The Alexandra Hospital; Kidderminster Hospital and Treatment Centre; Evesham hospital (Burlingham ward)
- Chair: Russell Hardy
- Chief executive: Glen Burley
- Website: www.worcsacute.nhs.uk

Worcestershire Acute Hospitals NHS Trust is an NHS trust which runs three hospitals and one ward in Worcestershire, England: The Worcestershire Royal Hospital in Worcester, the Alexandra Hospital in Redditch, Kidderminster Hospital and Treatment Centre in Kidderminster, and Burlingham Ward at Evesham Community Hospital in Evesham.

== History ==
=== Reorganisation ===
Services in Kidderminster and Redditch have been under threat for many years. Proposals to downgrade Kidderminster hospital provoked the establishment of Independent Community and Health Concern. Their candidate Dr Richard Taylor defeated David Lock the sitting Labour MP in the 2001 general election. The building of the new Treatment Centre, in Kidderminster was handled by Durrow healthcare consultancy.

In November 2013 further proposals to reduce services in Redditch were opposed by Redditch, Bromsgrove and Stratford councils who claimed "The removal of services from Redditch will leave what is already a vulnerable society, with the worst accessibility to health services in the region, and will introduce substantial inequalities with the populations of Redditch, Bromsgrove, Studley, Alcester and neighbouring areas being significantly worse off than all other areas in Worcestershire."

The trust is currently under the leadership of group chief executive Glen Burley and group Chair Russell Hardy

In November 2018 it was announced that the Hereford and Worcester Fire and Rescue Service's community risk team would be running an enhanced hospital from home service to help discharge patients from the hospital in Redditch for six months.

== Facilities ==
The Trust opened a new cancer treatment unit which has three linear accelerators in January 2015, a partnership with University Hospitals Coventry and Warwickshire NHS Trust, which it hopes will treat about 1,500 patients per year who previously had to travel for radiotherapy. It is also intended to extend the chemotherapy services available on the site.

== Performance ==
In December 2013 the Trust had to cancel non-urgent operations and appointments due to increased pressure on their A&E units.

In April 2014 it was revealed that the Trust had mislaid up to 270,000 ultrasound scans which were stored on obsolete technology dating back to 2004. Andrew Brown, whose complaints led to this revelation had been labelled a ‘vexatious complainant’ after raising concerns about his treatment at Worcestershire Royal Hospital over several years.

=== 2015 ===
The Trust's former Chief Operating Officer, Stewart Messer, attempted to ban Stuart Gardner, a UNISON representative of the West Midlands Ambulance Service from Trust premises in January after he told the BBC about 18 patients being treated in corridors at the Worcester Royal Hospital. Messer claimed the staff were upset. The Trust later agreed with the union they did not have the authority to ban the paramedic from its premises and an apology was issued for suggesting he should be. Nurses at the Alexandra Hospital complained of serious bullying by their seniors. In February it was reported that four emergency consultants had resigned from the Woodrow Drive hospital and another emergency consultant had resigned from the Worcestershire Royal Hospital. Consequently, the future of the Alexandra Hospital Accident and Emergency department was in doubt. Their resignation letter accused “successive management decisions” of undermining services at the Alexandra, which they say has “led to the self-fulfilling prophecy of failing and unsustainable services” and that the proposed service model would be “neither an A&E service nor a safe service”. In April, after a major incident at Worcestershire Royal Hospital, when seven patients had to be cared for in a corridor, Neal Stote, chairman of the Save the Alex campaign claimed that reconfiguration plans meant that "Worcestershire Acute Hospitals NHS Trust is trying to make us go to a hospital which is not only hard to get to but a hospital which, when you get there, is unable to cope." The Care Quality Commission carried out an inspection of the trust's accident and emergency departments in March. They found numerous examples where patient safety was at risk. Medication was not given in a timely manner, patient notes were not up-to-date and there were "inadequate" security arrangements. In September Redditch and Bromsgrove Clinical Commissioning Group asked local GPs not to refer patients to the Trust over the next three months because it was unable to treat patients within 18 weeks of referral. Waiting times were out of control in ear, nose and throat, trauma and orthopedics, gynaecology, general surgery and dermatology. 2,347 patients had waited more than 18 weeks. 11 patients were infected after treatment at the Alexandra Hospital endoscopy unit, seven with Pseudomonas and four with Serratia. The machines for decontaminating endoscopes were more than eight years old and in need of replacement. The trust was put into special measures in December 2015 after a Care Quality Commission inspection in July. It was still rated inadequate in June 2017, and performance, particularly in emergency care, had deteriorated.

=== 2016 ===
The trust was singled out by the West Midlands Ambulance Service as one of two in the region responsible for the most serious delays in ambulance turn around times.

=== 2017 ===
Two patients died while waiting on hospital trolleys in corridors at Worcester Royal Hospital during the 2017 New Year period. Many other patients at Worcester Royal Hospital during the first week of January spoke of long waits, patients in corridors, overstretched staff doing their best. Similar problems are in other NHS hospitals. A patient died from an overdose of DNP, which overworked medical staff failed to recognise in time. In December the trust diverted emergency patients away from the A&Es at two hospitals, the Worcestershire Royal Hospital and the Alexandra Hospital in Redditch. During the winter the trust had to divert emergency patients elsewhere at least 65 times. 35% of patients with suspected cancer waited longer than two weeks to see a cancer specialist though 93% of patients should be seen within that time.

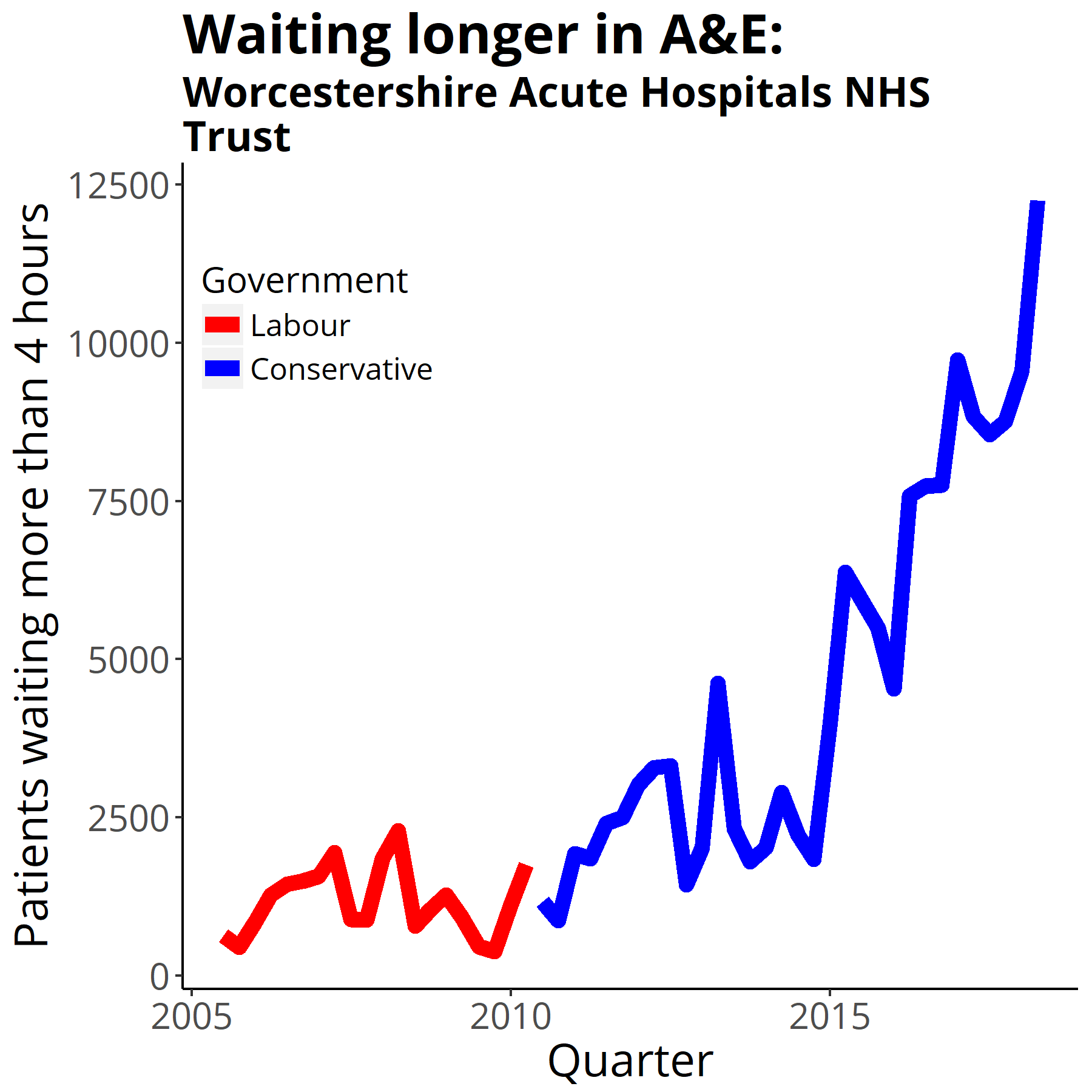
Four-hour target in the emergency department quarterly figures from NHS England Data from https://www.england.nhs.uk/statistics/statistical-work-areas/ae-waiting-times-and-activity/

In 2017-18 only 78.9% of A&E patients were seen within four hours.

=== 2018 ===
Eight year old Callum Cartlidge died after Worcestershire Royal Hospital failed to do a blood test and misdiagnosed his condition. The coroner described this as "a failure to provide basic medical care". If the illness had been identified the boy would have survived. The Carnall Farrar consultancy was engaged to review emergency care in the trust in January. They found that 700 patients a month were waiting more than 12 hours in the emergency department before being admitted or discharged, far more than the trust had reported. Waiting in corridors had "largely been normalised and accepted as standard practice” and ambulance handover delays were worsening. In September the trust announced that it needed 208 extra beds, increasing its current bed base by nearly a third, to reach a relatively safe occupancy level of 91%.

== Finance ==
The trust performs about 95,000 planned and emergency operations each year, with 140,000 A&E attendances and about 500,000 outpatient appointments. In September 2015 it predicted a deficit of £58 million against turnover of £364 million. It had been given a temporary working capital facility of £19m. The 30-year private finance initiative scheme at the Worcestershire Royal Hospital which runs until 2032 costs the trust about £13.6m a year. In February 2016 it was expecting a deficit of £65 million for the year 2015/6.

In 2019 it rejected a proposal by NHS Improvement to achieve a £64.4 million deficit for 2019-20 and would only accept a target £73 million deficit, about the same as the result achieved in 2018-9. It has opened nearly 100 additional beds at a cost of about £22.5 million.

== See also ==
- Healthcare in Worcestershire
- List of hospitals in England
- List of NHS trusts
