= 2015 Boston Borough Council election =

2015 UK local government election

Results of the 2015 Boston Borough Council election

Elections for Boston Borough Council, which governs as a second-tier authority the Borough of Boston were held on Thursday 7 May 2015. Following Boundary Commission changes between this election and the previous in 2011 to the wards, 30 councillors were elected to serve 15 wards. The election was held on the same day as other local elections.

== Composition of council seats before election ==
Immediately after the 2011 election, 19 councillors were Conservatives, 4 were Boston Bypass Independents, 4 were Independents, 3 were Labour and 2 were English Democrats. In the four-year term 4 Boston Bypass Independents changed their alignment to Independent. Two Conservative councillors became independent or unaligned. One Conservative councillor died in office and a UKIP member won the subsequent by-election. One English Democrat-affiliated councillor was disqualified due to non-attendance and a UKIP-affiliated candidate won the consequent by-election. The two UKIP councillors late in the term defected to the Lincolnshire Independent Party.

Party	Seats (2011 election)	Seats (13/04/15)
Conservative	19	16
Boston Bypass Independents	4	-
Independent	4	10*
Labour	3	3
English Democrat	2	1
Lincolnshire Independent	-	2

- Two councillors: unaligned sitting as independents not among original group of independents.

== Candidates by party ==
26 / 30
19 / 30
18 / 30
15 / 30
4 / 30
1 / 30

Boston Borough Council has 15 wards with a total of 30 councillors (down from 18 wards and 32 councillors in 2011). In this election, there are a total of 83 candidates standing (a decrease of 12% from the 95 candidates in the last election in 2011).

Incumbent councillors consisted of Conservative, Labour members and eleven Independent councillors. Conservatives stood in all wards though not for every vacancy with a total of 26 candidates; Labour fielded 19 candidates in 12 wards, 15 Independents stood.

Of the other parties standing, UKIP fielded 18 candidates in 15 wards, the Green Party 4 candidates (across four) and one Liberal Democrat stood in Witham Ward.

== Results ==
Boston Borough Council Election 2015
Party	Seats	Gains	Losses	Net gain/loss	Seats %	Votes %	Votes	+/−
Conservative	13			-6	43.3	40.8	18,177	
UKIP	13			+13	43.3	26.8	11,923	
Independent	2			-8	6.7	16.1	7,164	
Labour	2			-1	6.7	14.2	6,330	
Green	0			+0	0.0	2.0	843	
Liberal Democrats	0			+0	0.0	0.2	111	

=== Ward-by-Ward ===
Coastal Ward (2 seats)
Party	Candidate	Votes	%	±%
Conservative	Peter Bedford	985	35.2	−6.3
UKIP	Felicity Ransome	966	34.6	+17.3
Conservative	Tom Ashton	844	30.2	+7.8
Turnout		2,794		
Conservative hold		Swing		
UKIP gain from Conservative		Swing		

Fenside Ward (2 seats)
Party	Candidate	Votes	%	±%
UKIP	Anton Dani	703	37.8	+37.8
Labour	Nigel Welton	443	23.8	+23.8
Conservative	Carol Broomfield-Douglas	442	23.8	+23.8
Independent	Tiggs Keywood-Wainwright	272	14.6	+14.6
Turnout		1,860		
UKIP win (new seat)				
Labour win (new seat)				

Fishtoft Ward (3 seats)
Party	Candidate	Votes	%	±%
UKIP	Jonathan Noble	1,275	19.9	+19.9
Conservative	Judith Skinner	1,235	19.3	+19.3
Conservative	Paul Skinner	1,149	17.9	+17.9
Independent	Ossy Snell	890	13.9	+13.9
Independent	Helen Staples	870	13.6	+13.6
Labour	Sue Walsh	659	10.3	+10.3
Green	Clair Bird	329	5.1	+5.1
Turnout		6,407		
UKIP win (new seat)				
Conservative win (new seat)				
Conservative win (new seat)				

Five Village Ward (2 seats)
Party	Candidate	Votes	%	±%
Conservative	Aaron Spencer	857	25.5	−14.7
Conservative	Mike Cooper	815	24.3	+24.3
UKIP	Jodie Ransome	743	22.1	+1.3
Labour	Keith Adshead	334	10.0	+10.0
Labour	John Jenkinson	271	8.1	+8.1
Green	Dave Prickett	191	5.7	+5.7
Independent	David Witts	145	4.3	−18.1
Turnout		3,356		
Conservative hold		Swing		
Conservative gain from Boston Bypass Independents		Swing		

Frampton & Holme Ward (3 seats)
Party	Candidate	Votes	%	±%
Conservative	Colin Brotherton	1,305	22.5	+22.5
Conservative	Claire Rylott	1,155	19.9	+19.9
UKIP	James Edwards	1,084	18.7	+18.7
Independent	Stuart Ashton	995	17.2	+17.2
Independent	Alan Lee	764	13.2	+13.2
Labour	Mick Gall	491	8.5	+8.5
Turnout		5,794		
Conservative win (new seat)				
Conservative win (new seat)				
UKIP win (new seat)				

Old Leake & Wrangle Ward (2 seats)
Party	Candidate	Votes	%	±%
Conservative	Maureen Dennis	828	28.1	−10.7
UKIP	Barrie Pierpoint	736	24.9	+8.7
UKIP	Geoff Woodhouse	699	23.7	+23.7
Conservative	Frank Pickett	687	23.3	−3.7
Turnout		2,950		
Conservative hold		Swing		
UKIP gain from Conservative		Swing		

Skirbeck Ward (3 seats)
Party	Candidate	Votes	%	±%
UKIP	Stephen Ball	1,116	25.2	+25.2
Conservative	Martin Griggs	655	14.8	+14.8
Labour	Paul Gleeson	611	13.8	+13.8
Conservative	Sean Rickell	602	13.6	+13.6
Labour	Paul Goodale	597	13.5	+13.5
Labour	Paul Kenny	578	13.0	+13.0
Green	Victoria Percival	276	6.2	+6.2
Turnout		4,435		
UKIP win (new seat)				
Conservative win (new seat)				
Labour win (new seat)				

St Thomas' Ward
Party	Candidate	Votes	%	±%
Independent	Alison Austin	517	50.6	+50.6
UKIP	Paul Baker	225	22.0	+22.0
Conservative	Darron Abbott	168	16.5	+16.5
Labour	Norman Walsh	79	7.7	+7.7
Independent	Cyril Nyman	32	3.1	+3.1
Turnout		1,021		
Independent win (new seat)				

Staniland Ward (2 seats)
Party	Candidate	Votes	%	±%
UKIP	Brian Rush	678	29.4	+29.4
Conservative	Ben Evans	477	20.7	+20.7
Conservative	Yvonne Gunter	454	19.7	+19.7
Labour	Pamela Kenny	344	14.9	+14.9
Labour	Chris Roberts	255	11.0	+11.0
Independent	Gloria Smith	100	4.3	+4.3
Turnout		2,308		
UKIP win (new seat)				
Conservative win (new seat)				

Station Ward
Party	Candidate	Votes	%	±%
UKIP	Sue Ransome	275	43.9	+43.9
Conservative	Tristan Gilbert	157	25.0	+25.0
Labour	Wayne Sutcliffe	148	23.6	+23.6
Green	Joe Pepper	47	7.5	+7.5
Majority		118	18.9	
Turnout		627		
UKIP win (new seat)				

Swineshead & Holland Fen Ward (2)
Party	Candidate	Votes	%	±%
Conservative	Michael Brookes	1,190	35.5	−9.1
UKIP	Elizabeth Ransome	652	19.5	+19.5
Conservative	Paula Cooper	591	17.6	+17.6
Independent	Richard Leggott	584	17.4	−20.5
UKIP	Donna Watton	332	9.9	+9.9
Turnout		3,349		
Conservative hold		Swing		
UKIP gain from Independent		Swing		

Trinity Ward (2 seats)
Party	Candidate	Votes	%	±%
Conservative	Gordon Gregory	731	26.3	+26.3
UKIP	Yvonne Stevens	698	25.2	+25.2
Conservative	Gurdip Samra	632	22.8	+22.8
Labour	Wendy Gleeson	358	12.9	+12.9
Labour	Jan Finch	356	12.8	+12.8
Independent	Dennis Bambridge	342		
Turnout		2,775		
Conservative win (new seat)				
UKIP win (new seat)				

West Ward
Party	Candidate	Votes	%	±%
Conservative	Stephen Woodliffe	634	59.3	+59.3
UKIP	Don Ransome	322	30.1	+30.1
Labour	Andrew Finch	113	10.6	+10.6
Majority		312	29.2	
Turnout		967		
Conservative win (new seat)				

Witham Ward (2 seats)
Party	Candidate	Votes	%	±%
UKIP	Stephen Raven	593	21.1	+6.3
UKIP	Viven Edge	558	19.9	+19.9
Conservative	Mary Wright	398	14.2	−12.0
Conservative	Daniel Elkington	363	12.9	−9.9
Independent	Carol Taylor	298	10.6	+10.6
Labour	Andy Cook	261	9.3	−6.3
Labour	Ben Cook	225	8.0	+8.0
Liberal Democrats	Paul Appleby	111	4.0	−3.7
Turnout		2,696		
UKIP gain from Conservative		Swing		
UKIP gain from Conservative		Swing		

Wyberton Ward (2 seats)
Party	Candidate	Votes	%	±%
Independent	Richard Austin	920	29.5	+29.5
UKIP	David Brown	600	19.2	+19.2
Conservative	James Knowles	418	13.4	+13.4
Conservative	Sally Parker	405	13.0	+13.0
Independent	Pat Cooper	319	10.2	+10.2
Independent	Sue Bell	248	8.0	+8.0
Labour	Norman Hart	207	6.6	+6.6
Turnout		3,117		
Independent win (new seat)				
UKIP win (new seat)				
