= Shadow Economic Secretary to the Treasury =

Junior member of the Official Opposition frontbench

- Style: Shadow Economic Secretary (informal); Shadow Minister (formal)
- Member of: Official Opposition frontbench
- Appointer: Leader of the Opposition
- Formation: 11 May 2010
- First holder: David Hanson

The Shadow Economic Secretary to the Treasury is a position in the Official Opposition frontbench.

The shadow minister is the opposite number to the economic secretary to the treasury, holding them and the treasury to account. Led by the shadow chancellor of the exchequer and the shadow chief secretary to the treasury, they are a junior opposition spokesperson for the Treasury.

== List of shadow ministers ==
Name	Portrait	Term of office		Party	Opposition Leader
David Hanson MP for Delyn		8 October 2010	7 October 2011	Labour	Ed Miliband
Cathy Jamieson; MP for Kilmarnock and Loudoun		7 October 2011	11 October 2013	Labour	Ed Miliband
Catherine McKinnell; MP for Newcastle upon Tyne North		11 October 2013	8 May 2015	Labour	Ed Miliband
Alison McGovern; MP for Wirral South		8 May 2015	14 September 2015	Labour	Harriet Harman
Richard Burgon; MP for Leeds East		18 September 2015	27 June 2016	Labour	Jeremy Corbyn
Jonathan Reynolds; MP for Stalybridge and Hyde		6 October 2016	6 April 2020	Labour	Jeremy Corbyn
Pat McFadden; MP for Wolverhampton South East		9 April 2020	29 November 2021	Labour	Keir Starmer
Tulip Siddiq MP for Hampstead and Kilburn		4 December 2021	5 July 2024	Labour	Keir Starmer
Alan Mak MP for Havant		18 July 2024	5 November 2024	Conservative	Rishi Sunak
Mark Garnier MP for Wyre Forest		6 November 2024	Incumbent	Conservative	Kemi Badenoch
