= Committees on Arms Export Controls =

The Committees on Arms Export Controls (formerly the Quadripartite Committee) was the name for the concurrent meeting of four House of Commons select committees, comprising the International Trade Select Committee, the Defence Select Committee, the Foreign Affairs Select Committee, and the International Development Select Committee.

The remit of the committee is to examine the Government's expenditure, administration and policy on strategic exports (licensing of arms exports and other controlled goods).

In 2015 to 2016 the committee did not meet for over 9 months after the chairman Sir John Stanley retired as an MP, because of a long delay in appointing new members. Chris White was elected chair in February 2016. In March 2016 an inquiry into the use of UK-manufactured weapons in Yemen was launched.

The committee was abolished, and its functions subsumed into the Business and Trade Committee, in January 2024.

== 2019-2024 Parliament ==
Members of the committee were drawn from the Defence Select Committee, Foreign Affairs Select Committee, Business, Innovation and Skills Committee (later the Business, Energy and Industrial Strategy Committee, then the Business and Trade Select Committee), and the International Development Committee.

Member	Party	Constituency
Mark Garnier MP (Chair)	Conservative	Wyre Forest
Neil Coyle MP	Labour (Note: Whip suspended from 11 February 2022 to 25 May 2023.)	Bermondsey and Old Southwark
Martin Docherty-Hughes MP	SNP	West Dunbartonshire
Tobias Ellwood MP	Conservative (Note: Whip suspended from 19 July 2022 to 15 October 2022.)	Bournemouth East
Chris Law MP	SNP	Dundee West
Emma Lewell-Buck MP	Labour Co-op	South Shields
Mark Menzies MP	Conservative	Fylde
Sir Mark Hendrick MP	Labour and Co-op	Preston
Tom Tugendhat MP	Conservative	Tonbridge and Malling
Claudia Webbe MP	Labour (Note: Whip suspended from 28 September 2020.)	Leicester East

=== Changes 2019–2024 ===
Date	Outgoing Member & Party	Constituency	→	New Member & Party	Constituency	Source
5 October 2020	Vacant		→	Sarah Champion MP (Labour)	Rotherham	
5 October 2020	Vacant		→	Theo Clarke MP (Conservative)	Stafford	
5 October 2020	Vacant		→	Navendu Mishra MP (Labour)	Stockport	
5 October 2020	Vacant		→	Kate Osamor MP (Labour)	Edmonton	
3 February 2021	Sir Mark Hendrick MP (Labour and Co-op)	Preston	→	Lloyd Russell-Moyle MP (Labour)	Brighton Kemptown	
16 November 2021	Vacant		→	Stuart Anderson MP (Conservative)	Wolverhampton South West	
5 January 2022	Martin Docherty-Hughes MP (SNP)	West Dunbartonshire	→	Vacant		
5 January 2022	Claudia Webbe MP (Independent)	Leicester East	→	Vacant		
25 January 2022	Vacant		→	Liam Byrne MP (Labour)	Birmingham Hodge Hill	
26 January 2022	Vacant		→	Dave Doogan MP (SNP)	Angus	
7 September 2022	Tom Tugendhat MP (Conservative)	Tonbridge and Malling	→	Vacant		
27 November 2022	Liam Byrne MP (Labour)	Birmingham Hodge Hill	→	Vacant		
27 November 2022	Theo Clarke MP (Conservative)	Stafford	→	Vacant		

== See also ==
- Parliamentary committees of the United Kingdom
