= Alexandra Hospital, Redditch =

Alexandra Hospital
- Worcestershire Acute Hospitals NHS Trust
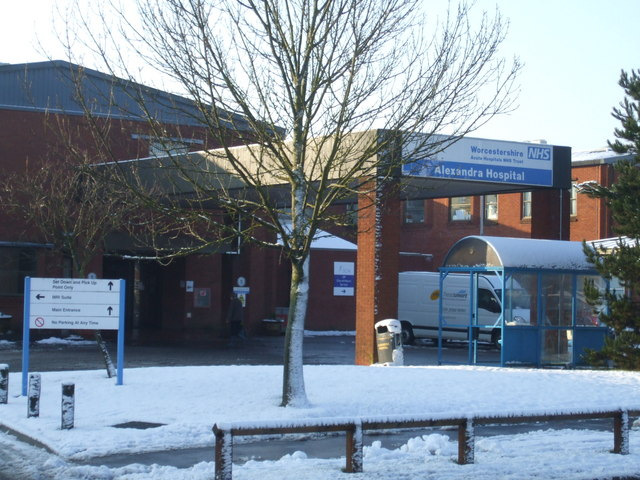
- Alexandra Hospital

- Shown in Worcestershire

Geography
- Location: Redditch, Worcestershire, England
- Coordinates: 52.2800°N 1.9127°W

Organisation
- Care system: NHS England
- Type: District General

Services
- Emergency department: Yes

History
- Founded: 1985

Links
- Website: www.worcsacute.nhs.uk
- Lists: Hospitals in England

Alexandra Hospital is an acute general hospital in Redditch, Worcestershire, England. It is managed by the Worcestershire Acute Hospitals NHS Trust.

== History ==
The hospital, which replaced the Smallwood Hospital at Church Green, was completed in 1985. It was officially opened by Princess Alexandra in April 1987.

After four consultants left the hospital because of "continuing uncertainty about the future of Redditch Hospital" in February 2015, there were calls from a local pressure group for Government intervention. Then, in May 2015, a new modular operating theatre was opened at the hospital, thereby increasing capacity.
