= Anthony Coombs (politician) =

British politician

Anthony Michael Vincent Coombs (born 18 November 1952) is a Conservative Party politician in the United Kingdom and a company director.

== Early life ==
Coombs was educated at Charterhouse School and Worcester College, Oxford.

== Political career ==
Coombs was a councillor on Birmingham City Council between 1978 and 1988. He contested Coventry North West in the 1983 General Election, but was defeated by incumbent Labour MP Geoffrey Robinson.

Coombs was MP for Wyre Forest from 1987 until 1997 when he lost the seat to Labour's David Lock. During his time as an MP he was a Parliamentary Private Secretary to David Mellor. He served as an assistant government whip from 1996 to 1997.

== Later career ==
He has been chairman of S&U Plc (a UK consumer and motor finance provider) since July 2008. He has served as a director of a number of companies and charities including the Birmingham Royal Ballet Trust Board. Coombs also serves on the Public Relations Committee of the Consumer Credit Association.

Parliament of the United Kingdom
Preceded by Esmond Bulmer	Member of Parliament for Wyre Forest; 1987–1997	Succeeded by David Lock
