= Mark Garnier =

British politician

Mark Garnier OBE MP
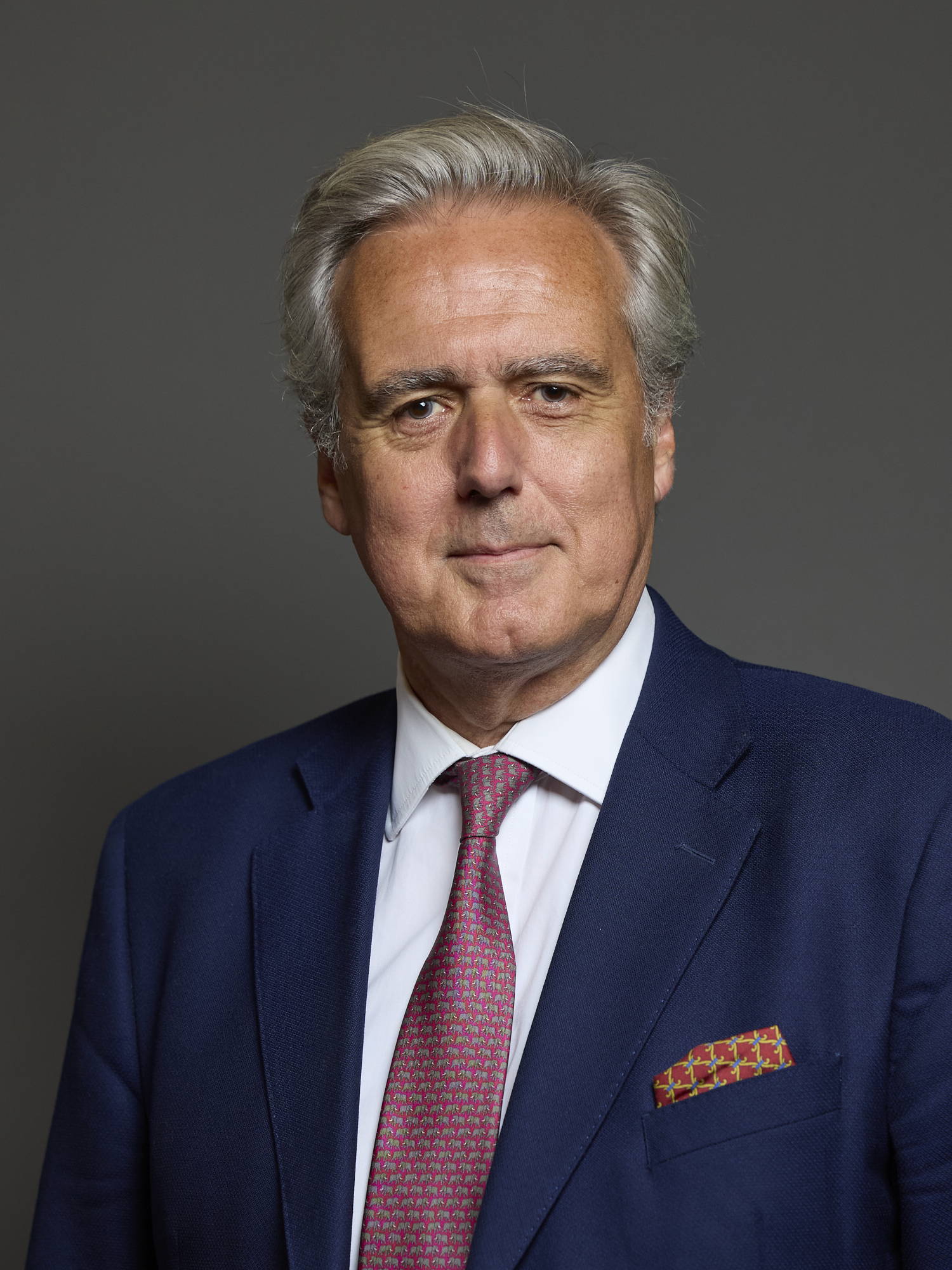
- Official portrait, 2024

Shadow Minister of State for Business, Innovation, Science and Trade
- Incumbent
- Assumed office 31 August 2026
- Leader: Kemi Badenoch
- Preceded by: Harriett Baldwin

Shadow Economic Secretary to the Treasury
- Incumbent
- Assumed office 6 November 2024
- Leader: Kemi Badenoch
- Preceded by: Alan Mak

Shadow Minister for Work and Pensions
- Incumbent
- Assumed office 22 July 2025
- Leader: Kemi Badenoch

Shadow Parliamentary Under-Secretary of State for Work and Pension
- In office 22 July 2025 – 31 August 2026
- Leader: Kemi Badenoch
- Preceded by: Alison McGovern (2024)
- Succeeded by: Joe Robertson

Shadow Minister for Energy Security and Net Zero
- Incumbent
- Assumed office 19 July 2024
- Leader: Rishi Sunak
- Preceded by: Alan Whitehead
- Succeeded by: Andrew Bowie

Chair of the Committees on Arms Export Controls
- In office 6 July 2020 – 16 January 2024
- Preceded by: Graham Jones
- Succeeded by: Committee abolished

Parliamentary Under Secretary of State for International Trade
- In office 15 July 2016 – 9 January 2018
- Prime Minister: Theresa May
- Preceded by: Position established
- Succeeded by: Graham Stuart

Member of Parliament for Wyre Forest
- Incumbent
- Assumed office 6 May 2010
- Preceded by: Richard Taylor
- Majority: 812 (1.8%)

Personal details
- Born: Mark Robert Timothy Garnier; 26 February 1963 (age 63) London, England
- Party: Conservative
- Children: 3
- Relatives: Edward Garnier (cousin)
- Occupation: Politician; banker
- Website: www.markgarnier.co.uk

Mark Robert Timothy Garnier OBE (born 26 February 1963) is a British politician and former banker who has been Member of Parliament (MP) for Wyre Forest since 2010. A member of the Conservative Party, he served as Parliamentary Under-Secretary of State for International Trade under Theresa May from July 2016 to January 2018.

Born in London, Garnier is the son of a founding member of UKIP. He was educated at Dulwich College Preparatory School and Charterhouse School, Godalming. He joined the London Stock Exchange in 1981 before leaving in 1986 to work for numerous other investment banks. He was managing director for South China Securities from 1989 to 1995 and then worked at Daiwa Securities Group. Garnier also worked at Edmond de Rothschild Group and Bear Stearns, as well as working as an independent hedge fund manager before becoming a partner at CGR Capital. He entered politics as a district councillor of the Forest of Dean District Council, serving from 2003 to 2007.

Garnier unsuccessfully stood as the Conservative candidate in Wyre Forest at the 2005 general election. He was elected for the constituency at the 2010 general election, and reelected in the 2015 general election. Garnier joined the government as Parliamentary Under-Secretary of State for International Trade under Prime Minister Theresa May in 2016, serving until his dismissal during the 2018 cabinet reshuffle. He was reelected in both the 2017 and 2019 general elections. He was the chair of the Committees on Arms Export Controls between 2020 and 2024. After the defeat of the Conservative Party in the 2024 general election, Garnier became Shadow Minister for Energy Security and Net Zero in the caretaker opposition frontbench of Rishi Sunak. After Kemi Badenoch's election as leader, Garnier became Shadow Economic Secretary to the Treasury. He was additionally appointed Shadow Minister for Work and Pensions in July 2025.

== Early life and career ==
Mark Garnier was born on 26 February 1963 in London to Peter and Patricia Garnier. His mother was a founding member of UKIP. He was privately educated at the private Dulwich College Preparatory School, London and Charterhouse School, Godalming.

In 1981, he joined the London Stock Exchange as a junior clerk on the Gilts Markets. In 1986, he left to join a succession of investment banks, working in the Far East Equity markets. Between 1989 and 1995 he worked as managing director for South China Securities, he followed this with a directorship for a year at the Japanese investment company Daiwa Securities Group.

Garnier subsequently worked as an associate director at Edmond de Rothschild Group and US investment bank Bear Stearns. Between 1999 and 2005, he worked as an independent hedge fund manager before becoming a partner at US equities company CGR Capital. After working for CGR Capital for three years, he became a partner at both Severn Capital and Augmentor.

Garnier was a district councillor of the Forest of Dean District Council from 2003 to 2007.

== Parliamentary career ==
Garnier stood as the Conservative candidate in Wyre Forest at the 2005 general election, coming second with 28.7% of the vote behind the incumbent independent MP Richard Taylor.

=== 1st term as MP (2010–2015) ===
At the 2010 general election, Garnier was elected to Parliament as MP for Wyre Forest with 36.9% of the vote and a majority of 2,643.

Garnier made his maiden speech on 7 June 2010, where he set out his scepticism about further integration in the European Union, and focused on the economic and trading gains to be had from trading relationships.

Throughout his time in Parliament, Garnier, himself a smoker, has campaigned strongly to end tobacco smuggling. In 2012 it was reported he had accepted tickets for the Chelsea Flower Show from Japan Tobacco International (JTI), costing £1,100. Commenting on this he said: "All of us who are MPs in Worcestershire have taken pay cuts of some form or other from coming out of the private sector... If we wanted to have our nose in the trough I could go back to being an investment banker. The reason I'm an MP is the complete opposite to having my nose in the trough. Two years of hundred-hour weeks. To pick on this one thing is really irritating".

In a speech on 19 January 2012, Garnier criticised a Labour proposal to set a minimum age for owning a shotgun certificate, arguing that shooting was a major competitive sport and that based on Countryside Alliance statistics there was "no reason" to feel uncomfortable with under-10s having licensed access to shotguns.

Also in January 2012, Garnier, along with fellow Conservative MP Richard Harrington, spoke about the right environment for business to be essential. He thinks can be achieved for young people through vocational courses in higher education that offer practical skills to become entrepreneurial.

Garnier was named by the ConservativeHome website as one of a minority of loyal Conservative backbench MPs not to have voted against the government in any significant rebellions in September 2012. Garner was subsequently one of 80 Conservative MPs to oppose the Coalition's Marriage (Same Sex Couples) Act 2013. Garnier voted against equal marriage (allowing same sex partners to legally marry).

In 2013 Garnier caused offence when, in the Kidderminster Shuttle (local paper) he responded to the concerns of a local Anglican priest who criticised the government record that led to food banks. He said, “I am amazed she thinks foodbanks are a bad thing – if anything, they are a sign of Christianity and charity,” he added. He further commented that they gave the Church a chance to do some good.

In November 2014, Garnier voiced his support for HS2, believing that Birmingham Airport will be an increasingly significant hub for the region that will help to ease pressure on Heathrow.

In December 2014, Garnier was criticised by Labour's Jonathan Ashworth for comments he made during a speech at the Institute of Economic Affairs. Garnier said of the need for a stronger message to Conservative supporters: "We need to be giving a much clearer message to them that they don't have to worry about politicians mucking around with tax rates in order to try and attract a few dog-end voters in the outlying regions of the country." Garnier later said: "If I used slack language in order to make a point, I am sorry if I caused any offence to anybody. I believe every voter is important everywhere".

=== 2nd term as MP (2015–2017) ===
At the 2015 general election, Garnier was re-elected as MP for Wyre Forest with an increased vote share of 45.3% and an increased majority of 12,871.

Since July 2015, Garnier has been the vice-chair of the All Party Parliamentary Group for Space.

In December 2015, Garnier expressed disappointment at the decision of the regulator not to investigate the incentives, pay and culture of banks and their potential association with misconduct including the Libor scandal.

Garnier was the local MP of Natalie Connolly, a woman killed in 2016. Garnier, alongside MP Harriet Harman have since taken action to resolve the issues of the "rough sex" defence by advocating amendments to the Domestic Abuse Bill in England and Wales.

In the lead-up to the 2016 EU membership referendum Garnier supported Remain. In October 2017, he said that 'doom-mongers like himself' had been proved wrong since the Brexit vote.

On 17 July 2016, he was appointed to the newly created position of Parliamentary Under-Secretary of State for International Trade but was dismissed on 9 January 2018 after the cabinet reshuffle.

=== 3rd term as MP (2017–2019) ===
Garnier was again re-elected at the snap 2017 general election with an increased vote share of 58.4% and an increased majority of 13,334.

In October 2017, the Cabinet Office began an investigation into a potential breach of the ministerial code after The Mail on Sunday revealed he had sent an aide, whom he called "sugar tits", to buy two vibrators from a sex shop while he waited outside, allegedly one for his wife and one for a colleague who worked at his constituency office. The investigation, which reported on 21 December 2017, concluded that Garnier did not break the ministerial code (the incidents having occurred before he was appointed) and had not acted inappropriately since becoming a minister.

=== 4th term as MP (2019–2024) ===
At the 2019 general election, Garnier was again re-elected with an increased vote share of 65.2% and an increased majority of 21,413.

In July 2020, Garnier was selected as chair of the Committees on Arms Export Controls. The committee examines export licensing decisions, such as the decision to resume exports to Saudi Arabia. Private Eye reported that, in 2018, Garnier had taken a 5-day trip to the kingdom, with Saudi Arabia paying the £7,000 cost.

In August 2021, former Carshalton and Wallington Liberal Democrat MP Tom Brake, now Director of Unlock Democracy, wrote to Chris Bryant MP, the Chair of the Commons Select Committee on Standards, to examine the dual roles of those MPs who sit on APPGs while also having paid appointments in the sectors of interest of the APPG. In October 2021, Bryant announced a new "wide-ranging" inquiry into APPGs and into the rules regulations governing these unofficial parliamentary groups.

In November 2021, Sky News political reporter Sophie Morris reported how Garnier had spoken in the Commons on 22 separate occasions since November 2019, and in three of those appearances had urged fellow MPs to give more support to the space sector. Garnier has urged the adoption of a "three-point strategy" that would enable the UK to have a "cohesive and coherent space policy."

Garnier was appointed Officer of the Order of the British Empire (OBE) in the 2024 New Year Honours for political and public service.

=== 5th term as MP (2024–) ===
At the 2024 general election, Garnier was again re-elected, with a decreased vote share of 32.1% and a decreased majority of 812. He subsequently became Shadow Minister for Energy Security and Net Zero under Rishi Sunak in July 2024. After the election of Kemi Badenoch as leader, he was appointed Shadow Economic Secretary to the Treasury in November 2024, and Shadow Minister for Work and Pensions in July 2025.

== Personal life ==
Garnier is married to Caroline; the couple have three children, named Edward, Jemima and George. His wife works as a manager in his parliamentary office. They live near Abberley, Worcestershire, England.

His cousin, Sir Edward Garnier KC, was Solicitor General from 2010 until 2012 and was the Member of Parliament for Harborough from 1992 until 2017.

Parliament of the United Kingdom
Preceded by Richard Taylor	Member of Parliament for Wyre Forest; 2010–present	Incumbent
