= Herefordshire and Worcestershire Health and Care NHS Trust =

Healthcare trust in England

- Type: NHS trust
- Established: 1 July 2011
- Headquarters: Kings Court Business Park; Charles Hastings Way; Worcester; WR5 1JR
- Region served: Herefordshire and Worcestershire
- Hospitals: Princess of Wales Community Hospital - Bromsgrove, Tenbury Community Hospital, Evesham Community Hospital, Malvern Community Hospital and Malvern Community Hospital, Elgar Unit, Stonebow Unit.
- Chair: Beej Parmar (2025 - )
- Chief executive: Ellen Rule (2025 - ) Robert Mackie (Interim, 2024 - 2025 ), Sarah Dugan (Retired, 2024)
- Staff: 5,000 circa.
- Website: www.hacw.nhs.uk

Herefordshire and Worcestershire Health and Care NHS Trust was established in Worcestershire, England, on 1 July 2011 to manage services previously managed by Worcestershire Primary Care NHS Trust's Provider Arm, as well as the mental health services that were managed by Worcestershire Mental Health Partnership NHS Trust.

The Trust provides community hospitals and community based nursing and therapy services across Worcestershire. On 1 April 2020, the Trust took over the delivery of mental health and learning disability services in Herefordshire in addition to their existing mental health and learning disability services in Worcestershire.

The Trust currently employees around 5,000 staff across the two counties. It was named by the Health Service Journal as one of the top hundred NHS trusts to work for in 2015. At that time it had 3127 full-time equivalent staff and a sickness absence rate of 4.36%. 69% of staff recommend it as a place for treatment and 58% recommended it as a place to work.

In 2017 it was named as a Global Digital Exemplar for Mental Health in the report Next Steps on the NHS, produced as part of the implementation of the Five Year Forward View. It has been given up to £5 million of national funding to develop new digital systems to support mental health patients. It made a three year agreement with Cambio Healthcare Systems in 2018 to create what was described as "a disruptive clinical solution for community and mental health trusts". This involves an integrated solution for e-prescribing and medicines administration and clinical decision support systems designed for mental healthcare. It will use FHIR standards which would let other NHS trusts link any third-party applications for secure access to their patient records.

On 2 November 2020, the organisations name was updated from Worcestershire Health and Care NHS Trust to Herefordshire and Worcestershire Health and Care NHS Trust to better reflect the geography of NHS services they deliver.

In Spring 2026 the trust was commended by NHS England for its work to improve staff experience and engagement. The trust was praised for its efforts to create a positive, inclusive and supportive environment in which staff feel valued and empowered.

== See also ==
- Healthcare in Worcestershire
- List of NHS trusts
