= Worcestershire Royal Hospital =

- Worcestershire Acute Hospitals NHS Trust
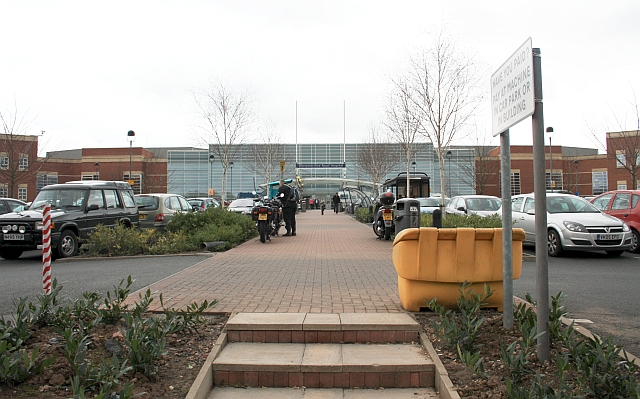
- Worcestershire Royal Hospital

- Shown in Worcestershire

Geography
- Location: Charles Hastings Way, Worcester, Worcestershire, England
- Coordinates: 52.19094°N 2.18164°W

Organisation
- Care system: NHS England
- Type: District General

Services
- Emergency department: Yes
- Beds: 500

History
- Founded: 2002

Links
- Website: www.worcsacute.nhs.uk
- Lists: Hospitals in England

The Worcestershire Royal Hospital is an acute general hospital located in Charles Hastings Way in Worcester, England. It is managed by the Worcestershire Acute Hospitals NHS Trust. The hospital replaced the Worcester Royal Infirmary in 2002 as the main hospital in the county of Worcestershire.

== History ==
The original hospital, known as the Worcester Infirmary, was built in 1771. The Infirmary was famous for hosting the first meeting of the Provincial Medical and Surgical Association in 1832, chaired by physician Charles Hastings, which would later become the British Medical Association.

A new wing of the Infirmary which included operating theatres, an orthopaedic department and pathology department was opened by the Prince of Wales in 1932. It became the Worcester Royal Infirmary (WRI) at that time and operated until 2002. The old Worcester Royal Infirmary site is now owned by the University of Worcester and acts as their City Campus. A medical museum, The Infirmary, exists on the site.

== New hospital ==
A new hospital was procured under a Private Finance Initiative contract to replace the Worcester Royal Infirmary in 1999, with the new site located on the eastern side of the city. The new hospital was designed by Anshen Dyer, built by Bovis Lend Lease at a cost of £85 million and opened in March 2002. Expansion of the hospital took place when the Worcestershire Oncology Centre opened on the site in January 2015.

== Facilities ==
The hospital is located in Charles Hastings Way, named after Charles Hastings, a leading physician with a longstanding connection to healthcare in the city of Worcester and nationally. It has 500 beds and nine operating theatres. Facilities management services are provided by ISS.
