= Boston Bypass Independents =

- Leader: Helen Staples
- Founded: September 2006; 19 years ago
- Registered: 11 December 2006; 19 years ago
- Dissolved: 5 December 2012; 13 years ago
- Headquarters: Boston, Lincolnshire
- Ideology: Localism
- Colours: Yellow

Website
- getbostonmoving.blogspot.com

The Boston Bypass Independents was a localist political party founded in 2006 based in Boston, Lincolnshire, England. It was renamed the Boston District Independents in 2011 and was dissolved in 2012.

The party campaigned on a wide range of issues but principally on the more vigorous promotion of a bypass for the town. The party won a majority of the seats on Boston Borough Council at the 2007 election and retained control of the council until the 2011 election, when it lost control to the Conservatives. The party was renamed the Boston District Independents (BDI) shortly after the 2011 election, and was deregistered as a political party in December 2012, with its remaining councillors becoming independents and sitting as a political group rather than a registered party.

In the 2023 Boston Borough Council election, the Boston Independents, a locally focused party unrelated to the BDI, won control of Boston Borough Council with 24 out of 30 seats.

== History ==
=== Formation ===
The Boston Bypass Independent Party was formed in September 2006 and formally registered as a political party with the Electoral Commission in December 2006. The bypass issue had already generated two campaign groups, the Boston & District Bypass Pressure Group (BBPG) and the Boston Bypass & Economic Growth Pressure Group (BBEG), and the BBI hoped to give this campaign a political element. Additionally the party hoped to re-invigorate local politics in the town which were perceived to have stagnated with several councillors elected unopposed.

The BBI group were partly inspired by the success of the Kidderminster Hospital Campaign, which won 16 of the seats on Wyre Forest District Council in 2004.

=== 2007 Boston Borough Council election ===
The party's slogan for the 2007 local elections was "Getting Boston Moving". Boston had no opposition group on the council prior to the election, as all the Conservative, Labour, Liberal Democrat and independent councillors were represented in a joint administration, meaning that public discontent over traffic congestion was directed at all the existing councillors. The Boston Bypass Independents won the election in a landslide victory with 25 seats, the first party to take overall control since the borough was formed in 1974. All the Labour and Liberal Democrat councillors lost their seats, with only five Conservatives and two independents elected.

=== Better Boston Group ===
The Better Boston Group was a political group that split from the Boston Bypass Independents in October 2007 under the leadership of Cllr Anne Dorrian. She had unsuccessfully stood for leadership of the BBI group after their landslide victory in April 2007. It had four councillors on Boston Borough Council. Cllr Brian Rush, the other unsuccessful candidate for party leadership in April 2007, of the group said of the Boston Bypass Independents that "We came in on a typhoon and we are nothing more than a gentle breeze now. It appears to me that we haven't done anything yet. There is nothing that I can put my hand on and say the BBI have thought of that, the inspiration was there and they have carried it through." The group criticised the record of the BBI, including their approval of the Lincolnshire County Council Transport Strategy for Boston. A deal with the county council was struck to aid the BBI with the bypass proposal if they agreed not to stand in the next county council elections, prompting two councillors to resign. The chairman of the Boston Bypass Pressure Group also called on Cllr Austin and his deputy, Cllr Peter Jordan to resign over the deal with Lincolnshire Council. Both Cllrs Austin and Jordan vigorously denied any such deal and there were four BBI candidates in the subsequent County Council elections in 2009.

In 2008, leader Richard Austin helped found a county-wide party, "Lincolnshire Independents – Lincolnshire First!".

=== 2008 by-elections ===
One councillor stood down in June 2008 when he was convicted of drink driving. The party lost the subsequent by-election in Coastal ward on 25 July 2008 to the Conservative candidate.

Another by-election in Fenside ward on 13 November 2008 saw the party lose another seat to the British National Party, on a 22% turnout.

By the end of 2008, the party had 18 borough councillors remaining, after losing four members in defections to the Better Boston Group, one to become an independent, and two in by-elections.

=== 2009 County Council election ===
In the Lincolnshire County Council election on 4 June 2009, party leader Richard Austin lost his Boston South seat to the Conservative candidates, but Ray Newell took the Boston West seat from Labour.

In July 2009, the Audit Commission said, in an assessment covering the period from 2004 to 2009, that the council gave poor value for money for taxpayers. That period included 3 years of the previous administration's term of office and only 2 under the BBI. The next recent report from the Audit Commission, in February 2010, judged Boston as a 'fair' Council.

=== 2011 Boston Borough Council election ===
In May 2011, the BBI suffered heavy losses, with 14 of the remaining 18 Boston Bypass Independents losing their seats. The Conservatives won a majority of seats, allowing them to become the new administration.

=== Name change ===
In July 2011, the name of the party was changed from the Boston Bypass Independents to the Boston District Independents "to shake off its image as the ‘bypass party’". The four remaining councillors at the time were Alison Austin, Richard Austin, Helen Staples and David Witts.

=== Frampton and Holme By-Election, 18 October 2012 ===
This by-election was triggered by the resignation of independent councillor Brian Rush (formerly a member of the Boston Bypass Independents). The Boston District Independents declined to stand and instead assisted another independent candidate, Maggie Peberdy, who came second with 139 votes or 26.7%, with the seat being won by another independent candidate, Stuart Ashton.

=== Dissolution ===
The Boston District Independents was deregistered as a political party in December 2012. Its remaining members on Boston Borough Council continued to sit as a less formal political group of independents rather than a party. At Boston Borough Council's Annual General Meeting in May 2013, the group was reconstituted as "Independent Group 2".

The bypass for which the party had campaigned remains unbuilt as of 2025.

== Leaders ==
- 2007–2011: Richard Austin
- 2011–2012: Helen Staples
