= David Lock =

British politician (born 1960)

David Lock KC

Parliamentary Under-Secretary to the Lord Chancellor's Department
- In office 29 July 1999 – 7 June 2001
- Prime Minister: Tony Blair
- Preceded by: Keith Vaz
- Succeeded by: Jane Kennedy

Member of Parliament for Wyre Forest
- In office 1 May 1997 – 14 May 2001
- Preceded by: Anthony Coombs
- Succeeded by: Richard Taylor

Personal details
- Born: 2 May 1960 (age 66)
- Party: Labour
- Education: Jesus College, Cambridge; Polytechnic of Central London

David Anthony Lock KC (born 2 May 1960) is a barrister and former Labour Party politician in the United Kingdom. He was educated at Esher Grammar School, Woking Sixth Form College, Jesus College, Cambridge (MA theology 1982) and Polytechnic of Central London (Diploma in law 1984), and went on to Gray's Inn as a Wilson Scholar in 1985.

He was elected as the Member of Parliament (MP) for Wyre Forest in the 1997 general election, but lost his seat in the 2001 election to Richard Taylor, the Independent Kidderminster Hospital and Health Concern candidate. He served as Parliamentary Under Secretary of State at the Lord Chancellor's Department from July 1999 to June 2001.

He became the first Labour MP in the Wyre Forest for many years but lost his seat when he supported changes to the accident and emergency services at Kidderminster General Hospital in the face of public opposition. The downgrading of emergency services at Kidderminster were the first of many such changes across the country, many of which attracted trenchant local opposition.

Following his election defeat he became a director of Searchflow Limited and founded a litigation funding company, IML Limited. In January 2002 he became Chair of the Service Authorities to the National Crime Squad and National Criminal Intelligence Service and was concerned with the merger of those bodies to become the Serious Organised Crime Agency. In late 2003 he returned to legal practice, heading up healthcare law at the law firm Mills & Reeve. He was then involved in a series of high-profile legal cases concerning healthcare and in 2008 returned to practice at the Bar. He is a member of Landmark Chambers, 180 Fleet Street, London. He was a member of the Department of Health Organ Donation Taskforce in 2008/09.

He is Chair of the West Midlands Labour Finance and Industry Group and is a qualified paraglider pilot. He was made a KC in 2011 and was the Birmingham Law Society's choice of "Barrister of the Year" in April 2011.

David Lock KC is a non-executive board director of Innovation Birmingham and also a non-executive director at Heart of England NHS Foundation Trust. He is also a Trustee of Brook, the sexual health advice charity for young people and a member of the British Medical Association Medical Ethics Committee.

Parliament of the United Kingdom
| Preceded by Anthony Coombs | Member of Parliament for Wyre Forest; 1997–2001 | Succeeded by Richard Taylor |
