= 2007 Boston Borough Council election =

2007 UK local government election

Map of the results of the election

Elections for Boston Borough Council, which covers the Borough of Boston, were held on 3 May 2007. The Boston Bypass Independents won the election in a landslide victory with 25 seats, the first party ever to take overall control of the council since the borough was formed in 1973. It was a single-issue party campaigning on getting a bypass for Boston. All the Labour and Liberal Democrat councillors lost their seats, with only five Conservatives and two Independents also elected. The turnout was 36.9%. The overall results were as follows:

Boston Borough Council elections 2007: summary results
Party	Candidates	Votes	% votes	Seats	Change
Boston Bypass Independents	32	16,294	52.1	25	+25
Conservative	21	7,376	23.5	5	-7
Labour	13	2,378	7.6	0	-11
Independent	5	2,341	7.5	2	-3
Liberal Democrats	4	1,537	4.9	0	-4
UKIP	8	1,137	3.6	0	0
BNP	1	194	0.6	0	0
English Democrat	1	76	0.2	0	0
Total	85	31,333		32	

Ward-by-ward results:

== Ward-by-ward results ==
=== Central Ward (1 seat) ===
Boston Borough Council elections 2007: Central Ward
Party	Candidate	Votes	%	±%
Conservative	Mike Gilbert	148	40.3	
Boston Bypass Independents	Keith Waterfield	136	37.1	
Labour	Jane Stewart	83	22.6	
Majority		12	3.2	
Turnout		367	31.1	
Conservative gain from Labour		Swing		

=== Coastal Ward (2 seats) ===
Boston Borough Council elections 2007: Coastal Ward (2)
Party	Candidate	Votes	%	±%
Boston Bypass Independents	Neil McGregor	681	30.5	
Conservative	Peter Bedford	557	25.0	
Boston Bypass Independents	Harry Windsor	515	23.1	
Independent	Kathryn Dawson	354	15.9	
UKIP	Felicity Ransome	123	5.5	
Turnout		1249	41.8	
Boston Bypass Independents gain from Independent		Swing		
Conservative hold		Swing		

=== Fenside Ward (2 seats) ===
Boston Borough Council elections 2007: Fenside Ward (2)
Party	Candidate	Votes	%	±%
Boston Bypass Independents	Guy Curley	317	27.3	
Boston Bypass Independents	Shelia Newell	315	27.1	
Labour	Andrew Bakewell	174	15.0	
Conservative	Michelle Chapman	134	11.5	
Labour	Norman Hart	116	10.0	
UKIP	Cyril Wakefield	107	9.2	
Turnout		636	22.6	+4.3
Boston Bypass Independents gain from Labour		Swing		
Boston Bypass Independents gain from Labour		Swing		

=== Fishtoft Ward (3 seats) ===
Boston Borough Council elections 2007: Fishtoft Ward (3)
Party	Candidate	Votes	%	±%
Boston Bypass Independents	Richard Lenton	846	17.9	
Boston Bypass Independents	Elizabeth Barker	821	17.4	
Boston Bypass Independents	Helen Staples	814	17.2	
Liberal Democrats	Ossy Snell	600	12.7	
Conservative	Paul Skinner	563	11.9	
Conservative	Raymond Singleton-McGuire	535	11.3	
Liberal Democrats	Malcolm Chapman	358	7.6	
UKIP	John Flynn	185	3.9	
Turnout		1848	39.2	+11.6
Boston Bypass Independents gain from Liberal Democrats		Swing		
Boston Bypass Independents gain from Conservative		Swing		
Boston Bypass Independents gain from Conservative		Swing		

=== Five Village Ward (2 seats) ===
Boston Borough Council elections 2007: Five Village Ward (2)
Party	Candidate	Votes	%	±%
Boston Bypass Independents	Tony Clarke	557	25.0	
Boston Bypass Independents	David Witts	513	23.0	
Conservative	Alan Day	509	22.8	
Conservative	James Winder	503	22.6	
UKIP	Jodie Sutton	146	6.6	
Turnout		1196	38.3	
Boston Bypass Independents gain from Conservative		Swing		
Boston Bypass Independents gain from Conservative		Swing		

=== Frampton & Holme Ward (1 seat) ===
Boston Borough Council elections 2007: Frampton & Holme Ward
Party	Candidate	Votes	%	±%
Boston Bypass Independents	Brian Rush	310	45.0	
Independent	Pat Cooper	216	31.3	
Conservative	Ray Sharpe	163	23.7	
Majority		94	13.7	
Turnout		695	51.4	
Boston Bypass Independents gain from Independent		Swing		

=== Kirton Ward (2 seats) ===
Boston Borough Council elections 2007: Kirton Ward (2)
Party	Candidate	Votes	%	±%
Boston Bypass Independents	Richard Dungworth	568	27.7	
Conservative	John Rylatt	540	26.4	
Independent	Colin Brotherton	511	24.9	
Boston Bypass Independents	Helen Proctor	430	21.0	
Turnout		1105	30.8	+5.1
Boston Bypass Independents gain from Independent		Swing		
Conservative hold		Swing		

=== North Ward (2 seats) ===
Boston Borough Council elections 2007: North Ward (2)
Party	Candidate	Votes	%	±%
Boston Bypass Independents	Gerry Clare	858	33.3	
Boston Bypass Independents	Peter Jordan	824	32.0	
Conservative	Mary Wright	436	16.9	
Conservative	Horace Wright	340	13.2	
Labour	Peter Gardner	119	4.6	
Turnout		1311	45.6	+12.8
Boston Bypass Independents gain from Conservative		Swing		
Boston Bypass Independents gain from Conservative		Swing		

=== Old Leake & Wrangle Ward (2 seats) ===
Boston Borough Council elections 2007: Old Leake & Wrangle Ward (2)
Party	Candidate	Votes	%	±%
Boston Bypass Independents	John Grant	518	26.7	
Conservative	Maureen Dennis	455	23.5	
Boston Bypass Independents	Janet Sargeant	454	23.4	
Conservative	Frank Pickett	338	17.4	
UKIP	Sue Ransome	175	9.0	
Turnout		1086	41.1	+9.8
Boston Bypass Independents gain from Conservative		Swing		
Conservative hold		Swing		

=== Pilgrim Ward (1 seat) ===
Boston Borough Council elections 2007: Pilgrim Ward
Party	Candidate	Votes	%	±%
Conservative	John Ruskin	173	49.0	
Boston Bypass Independents	Ron McIntyre	147	41.6	
Labour	Jay Uddin	33	9.3	
Majority		26	7.4	
Turnout		353	27.1	+0.5
Conservative gain from Labour		Swing		

=== Skirbeck Ward (3 seats) ===
Boston Borough Council elections 2007: Skirbeck Ward (3)
Party	Candidate	Votes	%	±%
Boston Bypass Independents	Anne Dorrian	669	19.8	
Boston Bypass Independents	Dave Hobson	613	18.2	
Boston Bypass Independents	Paddy Rush	528	15.6	
Labour	Peter Nodder	318	9.4	
Labour	Sandra Bakewell	315	9.3	
Conservative	Shane Smith	278	8.2	
Labour	Mick Gall	239	7.1	
UKIP	Mike Parkhill	222	6.6	
BNP	Roy Hughes-West	194	5.7	
Turnout		1292	33.0	+8.4
Boston Bypass Independents gain from Labour		Swing		
Boston Bypass Independents gain from Labour		Swing		
Boston Bypass Independents gain from Labour		Swing		

=== South Ward (1 seat) ===
Boston Borough Council elections 2007: South Ward
Party	Candidate	Votes	%	±%
Boston Bypass Independents	Alison Austin	358	56.8	
Conservative	Tony Austin	196	31.1	
English Democrat	Stephen Wyatt	76	12.1	
Majority		162	25.7	
Turnout		634	37.6	+12.8
Boston Bypass Independents gain from Conservative		Swing		

=== Staniland North Ward (1 seat) ===
Boston Borough Council elections 2007: Staniland North Ward
Party	Candidate	Votes	%	±%
Boston Bypass Independents	David Lingard	184	42.0	
Labour	Paul Goodale	113	25.8	
Conservative	Mary Clark	108	24.7	
UKIP	Elizabeth Ransome	33	7.5	
Majority		71	16.2	
Turnout		440	32.3	
Boston Bypass Independents gain from Labour		Swing		

=== Staniland South Ward (2 seats) ===
Boston Borough Council elections 2007: Staniland South Ward (2)
Party	Candidate	Votes	%	±%
Boston Bypass Independents	Martin Clarkson	537	30.4	
Boston Bypass Independents	Ray Newell	483	27.3	
Conservative	Paul Mould	271	15.3	
Labour	Paul Kenny	258	14.6	
Labour	Sally Gall	218	12.3	
Turnout		972	33.8	
Boston Bypass Independents gain from Labour		Swing		
Boston Bypass Independents gain from Labour		Swing		

=== Swineshead & Holland Fen Ward (2 seats) ===
Boston Borough Council elections 2007: Swineshead & Holland Fen Ward (2)
Party	Candidate	Votes	%	±%
Independent	Michael Brookes	717	31.8	
Independent	Richard Leggott	543	24.1	
Boston Bypass Independents	Alan Green	392	17.4	
Boston Bypass Independents	Anne Storry	309	13.7	
Conservative	Bob Lowrie	237	10.5	
Labour	Andrew Finch	59	2.6	
Turnout		1217	41.5	+7.7
Independent hold		Swing		
Independent hold		Swing		

=== West Ward (1 seat) ===
Boston Borough Council elections 2007: West Ward
Party	Candidate	Votes	%	±%
Boston Bypass Independents	Brenda Owen	393	55.4	
Conservative	Derek Richmond	264	37.2	
Labour	Peter Sylvester	53	7.5	
Majority		129	18.2	
Turnout		711	45.7	+10.6
Boston Bypass Independents gain from Conservative		Swing		

=== Witham Ward (2 seats) ===
Boston Borough Council elections 2007: Witham Ward (2)
Party	Candidate	Votes	%	±%
Boston Bypass Independents	Graham Dovey	672	35.8	
Boston Bypass Independents	Jim Blaylock	496	26.5	
Conservative	Mark Rawlings	427	22.8	
Labour	Shaun Forster	280	14.9	
Turnout		1100	36.4	
Boston Bypass Independents gain from Liberal Democrats		Swing		
Boston Bypass Independents gain from Labour		Swing		

=== Wyberton Ward (2 seats) ===
Boston Borough Council elections 2007: Wyberton Ward (2)
Party	Candidate	Votes	%	±%
Boston Bypass Independents	Richard Austin	634	32.3	
Boston Bypass Independents	John Storry	402	20.5	
Liberal Democrats	Bob Cory	360	18.3	
Liberal Democrats	Albert Tebbs	219	11.2	
Conservative	Sally Parker	201	10.2	
UKIP	Don Ransome	146	7.4	
Turnout		1078	35.8	+6.0
Boston Bypass Independents gain from Liberal Democrats		Swing		
Boston Bypass Independents gain from Liberal Democrats		Swing		
