= Wyre Forest (constituency) =

UK Parliament constituency (since 1983)

Coordinates: 52.40°N 2.25°W

- County constituency for the House of Commons
- Boundaries since 2010
- Boundary of Wyre Forest in West Midlands region
- County: Worcestershire
- Electorate: 77,800 (December 2010)
- Major settlements: Bewdley; Kidderminster; Stourport-on-Severn

Current constituency
- Created: 1983
- Member of Parliament: Mark Garnier (Conservative)
- Seats: One
- Created from: Kidderminster

Wyre Forest is a county constituency represented in the House of Commons of the Parliament of the United Kingdom. It elects one Member of Parliament (MP) by the first past the post system of election. The MP since 2010 is Mark Garnier of the Conservative Party who was re-elected in the 2024 general election.

== Boundaries ==
1983–1997: The District of Wyre Forest.

1997–2010: All the wards of the District of Wyre Forest except the Rock and Ribbesford ward.

2010–present: The District of Wyre Forest.

The Wyre Forest constituency as it was drawn for the 1997 election was almost coterminous with the Wyre Forest district, with around 2,000 extra electors from the district in the neighbouring Leominster constituency. Following its review of parliamentary constituencies for the 2010 election, the Boundary Commission recommended that the portions of the district currently in Leominster move into this seat, making the constituency and district wholly coterminous. These changes were brought about in part by the consideration of Worcestershire and Herefordshire separately for the drawing of parliamentary constituency boundaries.

The 2023 Periodic Review of Westminster constituencies left the boundaries unchanged.

== History ==
The Wyre Forest constituency was first fought under its present name in the 1983 general election, having succeeded the old Kidderminster seat, and was won for the Conservatives by Esmond Bulmer. Wyre Forest was held with relative ease by the Conservatives' Anthony Coombs in the 1987 and 1992 general elections; however the 1997 Labour landslide saw that party gain the seat with David Lock securing a majority of almost 7,000. Anger over the downgrading of Kidderminster Hospital reflected on Lock at the 2001 election, and Health Concern's Richard Taylor stormed to a decisive victory, then held the seat with a considerably reduced majority in 2005. Taylor lost to Mark Garnier of the Conservatives in the 2010 general election, since when Garnier has retained the seat, albeit with a slim majority of 1.8% over Labour at the 2024 general election.

Turnout in the Wyre Forest at general elections has generally been around 2–3% above the national average, but in 2001 the constituency recorded a 68.0% turnout as against 59.4% nationally; this spike (not repeated in 2005) is widely attributed to the intense local feelings on the hospital issue.

== Members of Parliament ==
Kidderminster prior to 1983

| Election | Member | Party |
|---|---|---|
| 1983 | Esmond Bulmer | Conservative |
| 1987 | Anthony Coombs | Conservative |
| 1997 | David Lock | Labour |
| 2001 | Richard Taylor | Health Concern |
| 2010 | Mark Garnier | Conservative |

== Elections ==
=== Elections in the 2020s ===
General election 2024: Wyre Forest
| Party | Candidate | Votes | % | ±% |
|---|---|---|---|---|
| Conservative | Mark Garnier | 14,489 | 32.1 | ▼33.1 |
| Labour | Vicki Smith | 13,677 | 30.3 | ▲7.5 |
| Reform | Bill Hopkins | 9,682 | 21.4 | New |
| Liberal Democrats | Shazu Miah | 2,809 | 6.2 | ▼1.9 |
| Green | John Davis | 2,443 | 5.4 | ▲1.5 |
| Independent | Leigh Whitehouse | 1,535 | 3.4 | New |
| Independent | Nigel Geary | 523 | 1.2 | New |
| Majority | | 812 | 1.8 | ▼40.6 |
| Turnout | | 45,158 | 58.3 | ▼6.5 |
| Conservative hold | | Swing | ▼20.3 | |

=== Elections in the 2010s ===
General election 2019: Wyre Forest
| Party | Candidate | Votes | % | ±% |
|---|---|---|---|---|
| Conservative | Mark Garnier | 32,960 | 65.2 | ▲6.8 |
| Labour | Robin Lunn | 11,547 | 22.8 | ▼9.5 |
| Liberal Democrats | Shazu Miah | 4,081 | 8.1 | ▲4.3 |
| Green | John Davis | 1,973 | 3.9 | ▲1.9 |
| Majority | | 21,413 | 42.4 | ▲18.3 |
| Turnout | | 50,561 | 64.8 | ▼1.0 |
| Conservative hold | | Swing | ▲8.2 | |

General election 2017: Wyre Forest
| Party | Candidate | Votes | % | ±% |
|---|---|---|---|---|
| Conservative | Mark Garnier | 29,859 | 58.4 | ▲13.1 |
| Labour | Matt Lamb | 16,525 | 32.3 | ▲13.0 |
| Liberal Democrats | Shazu Miah | 1,943 | 3.8 | ▲1.3 |
| UKIP | George Connolly | 1,777 | 3.5 | ▼12.6 |
| Green | Brett Caulfield | 1,025 | 2.0 | ▼0.3 |
| Majority | | 13,334 | 26.1 | ▲0.1 |
| Turnout | | 51,223 | 65.8 | ▲2.0 |
| Conservative hold | | Swing | | |

General election 2015: Wyre Forest
| Party | Candidate | Votes | % | ±% |
|---|---|---|---|---|
| Conservative | Mark Garnier | 22,394 | 45.3 | ▲8.4 |
| Labour | Matt Lamb | 9,523 | 19.3 | ▲5.0 |
| UKIP | Michael Wrench | 7,967 | 16.1 | ▲13.2 |
| NHA | Richard Taylor | 7,211 | 14.6 | ▼17.1 |
| Liberal Democrats | Andy Crick | 1,228 | 2.5 | ▼9.4 |
| Green | Natalie McVey | 1,117 | 2.3 | New |
| Majority | | 12,871 | 26.0 | ▲20.8 |
| Turnout | | 49,440 | 63.8 | ▼3.0 |
| Conservative hold | | Swing | | |

General election 2010: Wyre Forest
| Party | Candidate | Votes | % | ±% |
|---|---|---|---|---|
| Conservative | Mark Garnier | 18,793 | 36.9 | ▲7.8 |
| Health Concern | Richard Taylor | 16,150 | 31.7 | ▼6.9 |
| Labour | Nigel Knowles | 7,298 | 14.3 | ▼8.2 |
| Liberal Democrats | Neville Farmer | 6,040 | 11.9 | New |
| UKIP | Michael Wrench | 1,498 | 2.9 | ▲0.6 |
| BNP | Gordon Howells | 1,120 | 2.2 | New |
| Majority | | 2,643 | 5.2 | N/A |
| Turnout | | 50,899 | 66.8 | ▲2.9 |
| Conservative gain from Health Concern | | Swing | | |

=== Elections in the 2000s ===
General election 2005: Wyre Forest
| Party | Candidate | Votes | % | ±% |
|---|---|---|---|---|
| Health Concern | Richard Taylor | 18,739 | 39.9 | ▼18.2 |
| Conservative | Mark Garnier | 13,489 | 28.7 | ▲9.6 |
| Labour | Marc Bayliss | 10,716 | 22.8 | ▲0.7 |
| Liberal | Frances Oborski | 2,666 | 5.7 | New |
| UKIP | Rustie Lee | 1,074 | 2.3 | ▲1.5 |
| Monster Raving Loony | Bert Priest | 303 | 0.6 | New |
| Majority | | 5,250 | 11.2 | ▼24.8 |
| Turnout | | 46,987 | 64.2 | ▼3.8 |
| Health Concern hold | | Swing | ▼13.9 | |

General election 2001: Wyre Forest
| Party | Candidate | Votes | % | ±% |
|---|---|---|---|---|
| Health Concern | Richard Taylor | 28,487 | 58.1 | New |
| Labour | David Lock | 10,857 | 22.1 | ▼26.7 |
| Conservative | Mark Simpson | 9,350 | 19.1 | ▼17.0 |
| UKIP | Jim Millington | 368 | 0.8 | ▲0.2 |
| Majority | | 17,630 | 36.0 | N/A |
| Turnout | | 49,062 | 68.0 | ▼7.4 |
| Health Concern gain from Labour | | Swing | | |

=== Elections in the 1990s ===
General election 1997: Wyre Forest
| Party | Candidate | Votes | % | ±% |
|---|---|---|---|---|
| Labour | David Lock | 26,843 | 48.8 | ▲18.0 |
| Conservative | Anthony Coombs | 19,897 | 36.1 | ▼11.7 |
| Liberal Democrats | David Cropp | 4,377 | 8.0 | ▼13.4 |
| Referendum | William Till | 1,956 | 3.6 | New |
| Liberal | Chris Harvey | 1,670 | 3.0 | New |
| UKIP | Jim Millington | 312 | 0.6 | New |
| Majority | | 6,946 | 12.7 | N/A |
| Turnout | | 55,055 | 75.4 | ▼8.9 |
| Labour gain from Conservative | | Swing | ▼12.3 | |

General election 1992: Wyre Forest
| Party | Candidate | Votes | % | ±% |
|---|---|---|---|---|
| Conservative | Anthony Coombs | 28,983 | 47.8 | ▲0.7 |
| Labour | Ross Maden | 18,642 | 30.8 | ▲11.9 |
| Liberal Democrats | Mark Jones | 12,958 | 21.4 | ▼12.6 |
| Majority | | 10,341 | 17.0 | ▲3.8 |
| Turnout | | 60,583 | 82.3 | ▲4.8 |
| Conservative hold | | Swing | ▼5.6 | |

=== Elections in the 1980s ===
General election 1987: Wyre Forest
| Party | Candidate | Votes | % | ±% |
|---|---|---|---|---|
| Conservative | Anthony Coombs | 25,877 | 47.1 | ▼1.3 |
| Liberal | Anthony Batchelor | 18,653 | 34.0 | ▲1.6 |
| Labour | Nigel Knowles | 10,365 | 18.9 | ▼0.3 |
| Majority | | 7,224 | 13.1 | ▼2.9 |
| Turnout | | 54,895 | 77.6 | ▲2.5 |
| Conservative hold | | Swing | ▼1.5 | |

General election 1983: Wyre Forest
| Party | Candidate | Votes | % | ±% |
|---|---|---|---|---|
| Conservative | Esmond Bulmer | 24,809 | 48.4 | |
| Liberal | Anthony Batchelor | 16,632 | 32.4 | |
| Labour | Roger Williams | 9,850 | 19.2 | |
| Majority | | 8,177 | 16.0 | |
| Turnout | | 51,291 | 75.1 | |
| Conservative win (new seat) | | | | |

== See also ==
- List of parliamentary constituencies in Herefordshire and Worcestershire
- List of parliamentary constituencies in West Midlands (region)
