= 2011 Boston Borough Council election =

2011 UK local government election

Map of results of 2011 election

Elections for Boston Borough Council, which covers the Borough of Boston, were held on Thursday 5 May 2011. The Conservatives became the first of the main political parties to win an overall majority on the council since the borough was formed in 1973; they won 19 seats. The Boston Bypass Independents were almost wiped out, retaining only four seats. The remaining opposition is made up of four Independents, three Labour and two English Democrat councillors. The overall results, were as follows:

Boston Borough Council elections 2011: summary results
Party	Candidates	Votes	% Votes	Seats	Change
Conservative	24	10,806	38.2	19	+14
Boston Bypass Independents	27	6,999	24.7	4	-21
Independent	10	3,545	12.5	4	+2
Labour	11	2,586	9.1	3	+3
English Democrat	11	2,216	7.8	2	+2
UKIP	8	1,875	6.6	0	0
Liberal Democrats	4	265	0.9	0	0
Total	95	28,292		32	

== Ward-by-Ward Results ==
=== Central Ward (1 seat) ===
Boston Borough Council Elections 2011: Central Ward
Party	Candidate	Votes	%	±%
Conservative	Mike Gilbert	175	47.8	+7.5
Labour	Bob Wagstaff	107	29.2	+6.6
Boston Bypass Independents	Joanna Jones	68	18.6	−18.5
Liberal Democrats	Rui Vagueiro	16	4.4	+4.4
Majority		68	18.6	+15.4
Turnout		366	34.0	+2.4
Conservative hold		Swing	+0.5	

=== Coastal Ward (2 seats) ===
Boston Borough Council Elections 2011: Coastal Ward (2)
Party	Candidate	Votes	%	±%
Conservative	Peter Bedford	789	41.5	+16.5
Conservative	Raymond Singleton-McGuire	426	22.4	+22.4
Boston Bypass Independents	Mike Parkhill	359	18.9	−11.6
UKIP	Julie Moore	329	17.3	+11.8
Turnout		1903	44.1	+2.3
Conservative hold		Swing		
Conservative gain from Boston Bypass Independents		Swing		

=== Fenside Ward (2 seats) ===
Boston Borough Council Elections 2011: Fenside Ward (2)
Party	Candidate	Votes	%	±%
English Democrat	Elliott Fountain	231	18.9	+18.9
English Democrat	David Owens	195	15.9	+15.9
Boston Bypass Independents	John Blythe	182	14.9	−12.4
Boston Bypass Independents	Albert Cheung	176	14.4	−12.7
Labour	Norman Hart	162	13.2	−1.8
Labour	Wendy Gleeson	159	13.0	−3.0
Liberal Democrats	Helder Neves	68	5.6	+5.6
Liberal Democrats	Gilberto Figueira	51	4.2	+4.2
Turnout		1224	24.9	+2.3
English Democrat gain from Boston Bypass Independents		Swing		
English Democrat gain from Boston Bypass Independents		Swing		

=== Fishtoft Ward (3 seats) ===
Boston Borough Council Elections 2011: Fishtoft Ward (3)
Party	Candidate	Votes	%	±%
Independent	Ossy Snell	891	23.9	+23.9
Conservative	Judith Skinner	639	17.2	+5.3
Boston Bypass Independents	Helen Staples	626	16.8	−0.4
Conservative	Timothy Millington	472	12.7	+1.4
English Democrat	Dee Bills	397	10.7	+10.7
Conservative	Alma Andrijauskiene	391	10.5	+10.5
Independent	Helen Sheridan-Shinn	308	8.3	+8.3
Turnout		3724	39.7	+0.5
Independent gain from Boston Bypass Independents		Swing		
Conservative gain from Boston Bypass Independents		Swing		
Boston Bypass Independents hold		Swing		

=== Five Village Ward (2 seats) ===
Boston Borough Council Elections 2011: Five Village Ward (2)
Party	Candidate	Votes	%	±%
Conservative	Aaron Spencer	703	40.2	+17.4
Boston Bypass Independents	David Witts	391	22.4	−0.6
UKIP	Jodie Sutton	364	20.8	+14.2
Boston Bypass Independents	Hillie Witts	289	16.5	−8.5
Turnout		1747	38.9	+0.6
Conservative gain from Boston Bypass Independents		Swing		
Boston Bypass Independents hold		Swing		

=== Frampton & Holme Ward (1 seat) ===
Boston Borough Council Elections 2011: Frampton & Holme Ward
Party	Candidate	Votes	%	±%
Independent	Brian Rush	373	57.0	+57.0
Boston Bypass Independents	Yvonne Stevens	189	28.9	−16.1
UKIP	Carl Mason	92	14.1	+14.1
Majority		184	28.1	+14.4
Turnout		654	48.8	−2.6
Independent gain from Boston Bypass Independents		Swing	+36.6	

=== Kirton Ward (2 seats) ===
Boston Borough Council Elections 2011: Kirton Ward (2)
Party	Candidate	Votes	%	±%
Conservative	Colin Brotherton	573	28.3	+1.9
Independent	Alan Lee	518	25.5	+25.5
UKIP	Sue Ransome	276	13.6	+13.6
Boston Bypass Independents	Richard Dungworth	201	9.9	−17.8
English Democrat	Mark Blackamore	196	9.7	+9.7
Boston Bypass Independents	Tim Taylor	162	8.0	−13.0
Independent	Peter Ings	102	5.0	+5.0
Turnout		2028	34.2	+5.0
Conservative hold		Swing		
Independent gain from Boston Bypass Independents		Swing		

=== North Ward (2 seats) ===
Boston Borough Council Elections 2011: North Ward (2)
Party	Candidate	Votes	%	±%
Conservative	Derek Richmond	712	30.5	+13.6
Conservative	Gurdip Samra	594	25.4	+12.2
Boston Bypass Independents	Gerry Clare	541	23.1	−10.2
Boston Bypass Independents	Peter Jordan	490	21.0	−11.0
Turnout		2337	43.8	−1.8
Conservative gain from Boston Bypass Independents		Swing		
Conservative gain from Boston Bypass Independents		Swing		

=== Old Leake & Wrangle Ward (2 seats) ===
Boston Borough Council Elections 2011: Old Leake & Wrangle Ward (2)
Party	Candidate	Votes	%	±%
Conservative	Maureen Dennis	727	38.8	+15.3
Conservative	Frank Pickett	505	27.0	+9.6
Boston Bypass Independents	David Anderson	337	18.0	−8.7
UKIP	Felicity Ransome	303	16.2	+7.2
Turnout		1872	44.3	+3.2
Conservative hold		Swing		
Conservative gain from Boston Bypass Independents		Swing		

=== Pilgrim Ward (1 seat) ===
Boston Borough Council Elections 2011: Pilgrim Ward
Party	Candidate	Votes	%	±%
Conservative	Mark Baker	146	42.4	−6.6
Labour	Mike Sheridan-Shinn	93	27.0	+17.7
English Democrat	Jamie Taylor	57	16.6	+16.6
Boston Bypass Independents	Lesley Boyden	48	14.0	−27.6
Majority		53	15.4	+8.0
Turnout		344	29.7	+2.6
Conservative hold		Swing	-12.2	

=== Skirbeck Ward (3 seats) ===
Boston Borough Council Elections 2011: Skirbeck Ward (3)
Party	Candidate	Votes	%	±%
Labour	Paul Kenny	433	14.0	+4.6
Conservative	Gloria Smith	397	12.9	+4.7
Labour	Paul Gleeson	390	12.6	+3.3
Labour	Sally Gall	372	12.1	+5.0
Independent	Anne Dorrian	336	10.9	+10.9
English Democrat	Carl Rowe	306	9.9	+9.9
English Democrat	Callum McCuaig	259	8.4	+8.4
Boston Bypass Independents	Rachel Lauberts	206	6.7	−13.1
Boston Bypass Independents	Dave Hobson	198	6.4	−11.8
Boston Bypass Independents	Rob Lauberts	188	6.1	−9.5
Turnout		3085	33.6	+0.6
Labour gain from Boston Bypass Independents		Swing		
Conservative gain from Boston Bypass Independents		Swing		
Labour gain from Boston Bypass Independents		Swing		

=== South Ward (1 seat) ===
Boston Borough Council Elections 2011: South Ward
Party	Candidate	Votes	%	±%
Boston Bypass Independents	Alison Austin	359	51.7	−5.1
Conservative	Darron Abbott	224	32.3	+1.2
Independent	Pat Cooper	111	16.0	+16.0
Majority		135	19.4	−6.3
Turnout		694	39.3	+1.7
Boston Bypass Independents hold		Swing	-3.2	

=== Staniland North Ward (1 seat) ===
Boston Borough Council Elections 2011: Staniland North Ward
Party	Candidate	Votes	%	±%
Labour	Paul Goodale	118	28.0	+2.2
Boston Bypass Independents	Spencer Pearson	110	26.1	−15.9
English Democrat	Richard Green	85	20.1	+20.1
Conservative	Greg Frankowicz	66	15.6	−9.1
UKIP	Elizabeth Ransome	43	10.2	+2.7
Majority		8	1.9	−14.3
Turnout		422	37.5	+5.2
Labour gain from Boston Bypass Independents		Swing	+9.1	

=== Staniland South Ward (2 seats) ===
Boston Borough Council Elections 2011: Staniland South Ward (2)
Party	Candidate	Votes	%	±%
Conservative	Paul Mould	293	15.7	+0.4
Conservative	Yvonne Gunter	284	15.2	+15.2
Labour	Pam Kenny	265	14.2	−0.4
Boston Bypass Independents	Ray Newell	244	13.1	−14.2
Labour	Mick Gall	225	12.1	−0.2
Boston Bypass Independents	Sheila Newell	194	10.4	−20.0
English Democrat	Liam Blackamore	186	10.0	+10.0
English Democrat	Darren Crozier	175	9.4	+9.4
Turnout		1866	35.3	+1.5
Conservative gain from Boston Bypass Independents		Swing		
Conservative gain from Boston Bypass Independents		Swing		

=== Swineshead & Holland Fen Ward (2 seats) ===
Boston Borough Council Elections 2011: Swineshead & Holland Fen Ward (2)
Party	Candidate	Votes	%	±%
Conservative	Michael Brookes	792	44.6	+34.1
Independent	Richard Leggott	673	37.9	+13.8
Boston Bypass Independents	Jane Curley	312	17.6	+0.2
Turnout		1777	41.9	+0.4
Conservative gain from Independent		Swing		
Independent hold		Swing		

=== West Ward (1 seat) ===
Boston Borough Council Elections 2011: West Ward
Party	Candidate	Votes	%	±%
Conservative	Stephen Woodliffe	438	56.5	+19.3
Boston Bypass Independents	Ian Hill	208	26.8	−28.6
English Democrat	Ross Isham	129	16.6	+16.6
Majority		230	29.7	+11.5
Turnout		775	47.1	+1.4
Conservative gain from Boston Bypass Independents		Swing	+24.0	

=== Witham Ward (2 seats) ===
Boston Borough Council Elections 2011: Witham Ward (2)
Party	Candidate	Votes	%	±%
Conservative	Carol Taylor	439	26.2	+3.4
Conservative	Mary Wright	382	22.8	+22.8
Labour	Iris Beech	262	15.6	+0.7
UKIP	Samuel Flood	248	14.8	+14.8
Boston Bypass Independents	Patricia Pearson	133	7.9	−27.9
Liberal Democrats	Paul Appleby	130	7.7	+7.7
Boston Bypass Independents	Christine Scanlan	84	5.0	−21.5
Turnout		1678	34.8	−1.6
Conservative gain from Boston Bypass Independents		Swing		
Conservative gain from Boston Bypass Independents		Swing		

=== Wyberton Ward (2 seats) ===
Boston Borough Council Elections 2011: Wyberton Ward (2)
Party	Candidate	Votes	%	±%
Boston Bypass Independents	Richard Austin	487	24.8	−7.5
Conservative	James Knowles	348	17.7	+7.5
Conservative	Paul Skinner	291	14.8	+14.8
Independent	Sally Parker	233	11.8	+11.8
UKIP	Don Ransome	220	11.2	+3.8
Boston Bypass Independents	Paul Walker	217	11.0	−9.5
Independent	John Storry	171	8.7	+8.7
Turnout		1967	36.6	+0.8
Boston Bypass Independents hold		Swing		
Conservative gain from Boston Bypass Independents		Swing		
