= Richard Taylor (British politician) =

British politician (1934–2024)

Squadron Leader Richard Taylor MBE FRCP
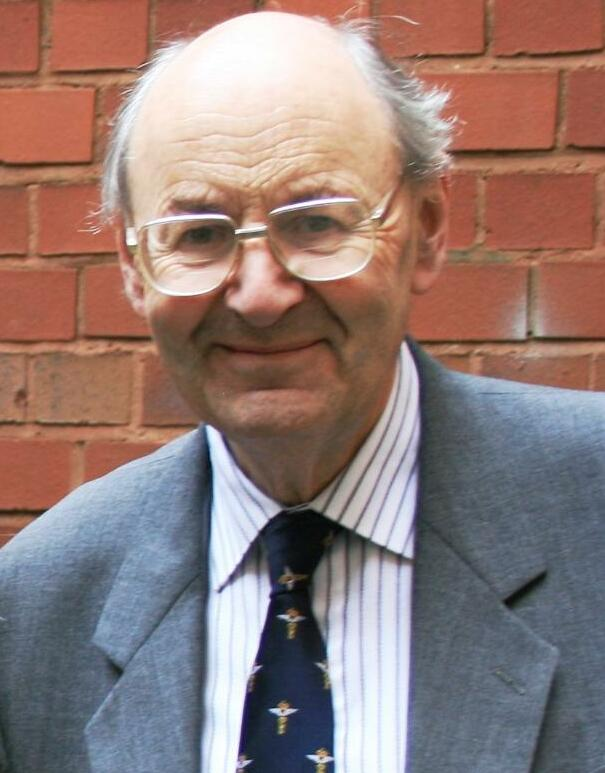
- Taylor in 2010

President of Independent Community & Health Concern
- In office 27 January 2000 – 26 June 2024

Member of Parliament for Wyre Forest
- In office 7 June 2001 – 12 April 2010
- Preceded by: David Lock
- Succeeded by: Mark Garnier

Personal details
- Born: 7 July 1934
- Died: 26 June 2024 (aged 89)
- Party: Independent
- Other political affiliations: Health Concern (2001–2024); National Health Action Party (2012–2024)
- Education: Clare College, Cambridge
- Profession: Medical doctor

Military service
- Allegiance: United Kingdom
- Branch/service: Royal Air Force
- Years of service: 1960 to 1964
- Rank: Squadron leader
- Unit: Medical Branch
- Battles/wars: Cold War

Richard Thomas Taylor (7 July 1934 – 26 June 2024) was an English medical doctor and politician. He served as a Health Concern Member of Parliament for Wyre Forest between 2001 and 2010. He was co-leader of the National Health Action Party.

== Background and education ==
Taylor was born on 7 July 1934. The son of Thomas Taylor and his wife Mabel Hickley, Taylor was educated at The Leys School in Cambridge. Taylor went to Clare College, Cambridge, and the former Westminster Medical School, now part of the Imperial College School of Medicine.

== Medical career ==
From 1959 to 1961, Taylor was pre-registration house officer at Westminster, Kingston and London Chest Hospitals in London. A medical officer in the Royal Air Force from 1960 to 1964, he was a registrar and senior registrar for appointments in London hospitals (1964–1972). Taylor latterly worked as a consultant physician at Kidderminster General Hospital from 1972 to 1995.

== Military service ==
On 1 October 1960, Taylor was commissioned as a flying officer in the Medical Branch of the Royal Air Force. On 1 April 1964, he was transferred to the reserve, ending his full-time service.

== Political career ==
Before entering politics, Taylor was a member of his local health authority, chairman of Kidderminster Hospital League of Friends (1996–2001), and a committee member of the Save Kidderminster Hospital Campaign (1997–2001).

Standing for Parliament as an Independent Kidderminster Hospital and Health Concern candidate at the 2001 general election, Taylor campaigned largely on a single issue, that of restoring the Accident & Emergency department of Kidderminster Hospital, which had been closed in 2000 due to cuts in the NHS. Taylor won with a majority of 18,000, defeating the incumbent Labour MP and junior minister, David Lock. The Liberal Democrats decided not to put up a candidate against him. The Liberal Democrats had previously stood down when faced with another independent candidate, Martin Bell in Tatton in 1997.

Taylor was re-elected at the 2005 election with a reduced majority of 5,250. Conservative candidate Mark Garnier took second place and Labour were pushed into third in the constituency. This made Taylor the first independent MP to retain a seat in the House of Commons in a second election since Frank Maguire in Fermanagh and South Tyrone in 1979.

He was a member of the Health Select Committee (2001–2010) and also became co-chair of the All Party Local Hospital Group, Vice Chairman of the All Party Group on Cancer, Vice Chairman of the Associate Parliamentary Flood Prevention Group, and Secretary of the All Party Group on Patient and Public Involvement in Health.

While his speeches in the Commons were mostly confined to the health service, Taylor also laid out an atypical collection of political views. These non-health policies included support for the renationalisation of the British railway system, and the availability of cannabis as a controlled drug. He also opposed the Iraq war and student top up fees.

Taylor lost his seat in the 2010 general election to the Conservative candidate, Mark Garnier, by a margin of 2,643 votes. The Liberal Democrats elected to field a candidate, who received 6,040 votes.

In 2013, Taylor announced his intention to stand for election in the 2015 general election, representing the National Health Action Party. At the election, Taylor finished fourth with 7,221 votes. He did not stand in the 2017 general election.

In June 2022, Taylor announced that his Party (now called Independent Health Concern) would not be standing in future elections and recommended that its supporters consider voting for independent candidates.

== Personal life ==
In 1962, Taylor married Ann Brett and they had one son and two daughters. After this marriage was dissolved, in 1990 he married Christine Miller and with her had another daughter.

Taylor lived in Kidderminster. He died from dementia and bowel cancer on 26 June 2024, at the age of 89.

== Honours ==
In the 2014 Queen's Birthday Honours, Taylor was appointed Member of the Order of the British Empire (MBE) 'for services to the community in Worcestershire especially to Kidderminster Hospital'.

== Electoral performance ==
Taylor contested the constituency of Wyre Forest at four general elections, the first three times for Independent Community and Health Concern (previously Independent Kidderminster Hospital and Health Concern), and in the 2015 for the National Health Action Party.

Date of election	Constituency	Party	Votes	% of votes	Result
2001 general election	Wyre Forest	Health Concern	28,487	58.1	Elected
2005 general election	Wyre Forest	Health Concern	18,739	39.9	Elected
2010 general election	Wyre Forest	Health Concern	16,150	31.7	Not elected
2015 general election	Wyre Forest	National Health Action Party	7,221	14.6	Not elected

== Bibliography ==
- Who's Who (A & C. Black, London, 2003) page 2125

Parliament of the United Kingdom
Preceded by David Lock	Member of Parliament for Wyre Forest; 2001–2010	Succeeded by Mark Garnier
