= Kidderminster Hospital =

- Worcestershire Acute Hospitals NHS Trust
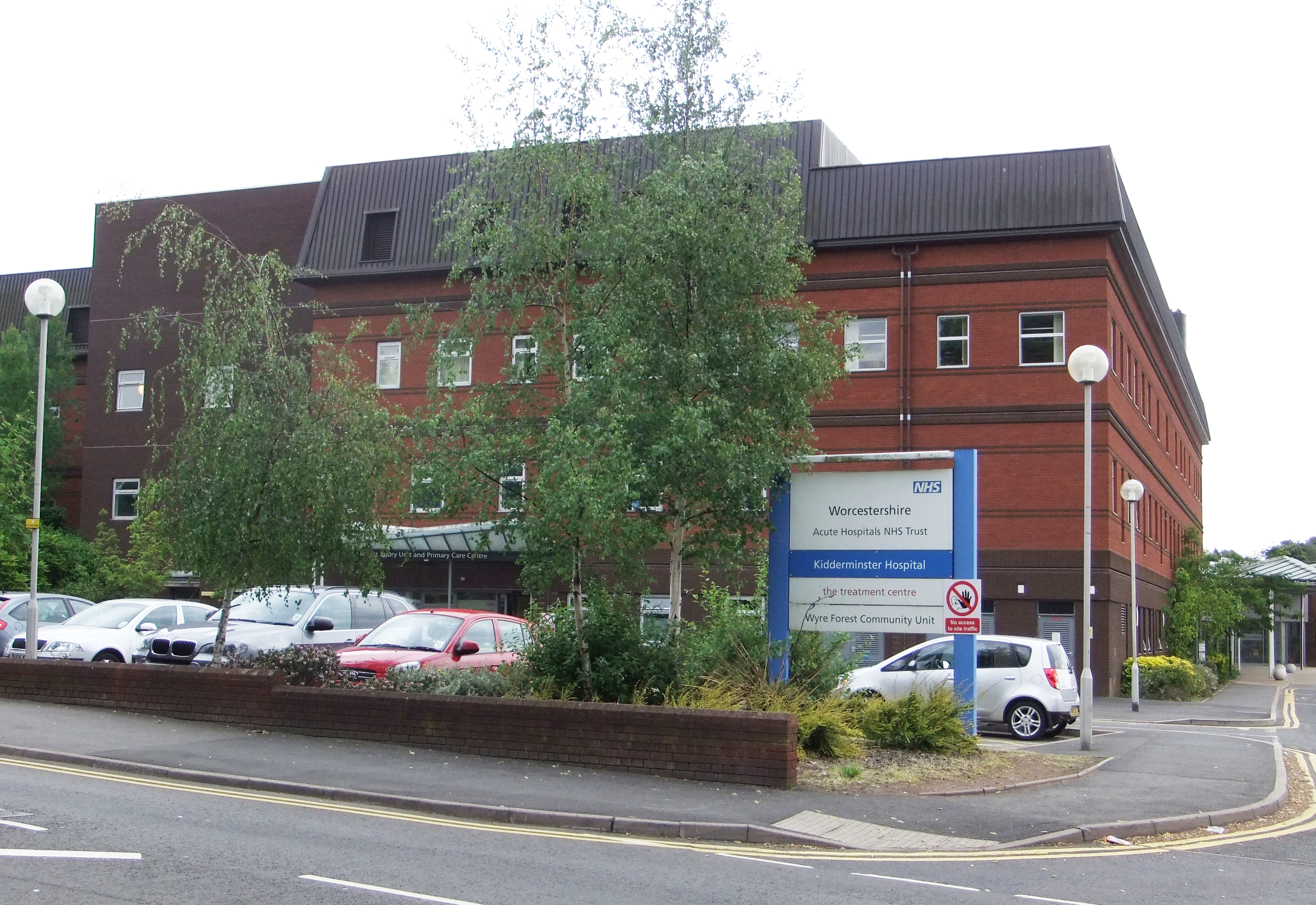
- Kidderminster Hospital

- Shown in Worcestershire

Geography
- Location: Kidderminster, Worcestershire, England
- Coordinates: 52.3860°N 2.2611°W

Organisation
- Care system: NHS England
- Type: District General

Services
- Emergency department: No

History
- Founded: 1884

Links
- Website: www.worcsacute.nhs.uk
- Lists: Hospitals in England

Kidderminster Hospital is an acute general hospital in Kidderminster in Worcestershire, England. It is managed by the Worcestershire Acute Hospitals NHS Trust.

== History ==
The hospital has its origins in the Kidderminster Union Workhouse Infirmary which was completed about 1884. The hospital joined the National Health Service as Kidderminster Infirmary and Children's Hospital in 1948. It became Kidderminster and District General Hospital in 1974 and Kidderminster General Hospital in 2000.

Standing for Parliament as an Independent Kidderminster Hospital and Health Concern candidate at the 2001 general election, Richard Taylor campaigned largely on a single issue, that of restoring the accident & emergency department of Kidderminster Hospital, which had been closed the previous year. A new treatment centre was opened by the Duchess of Gloucester on the site in April 2005.
