= Wyre Forest District Council elections =

Local government elections in Worcestershire, England

Wyre Forest District Council elections are held every four years. Wyre Forest District Council is the local authority for the non-metropolitan district of Wyre Forest in Worcestershire, England. Prior to 2019 elections were held three years out of every four, with a third of the council elected each time. Since the last boundary changes in 2015, 33 councillors have been elected from 12 wards.

== Council elections ==
Summary of the council composition after recent council elections, click on the year for full details of each election. Boundary changes took place for the 2004 and 2015 elections, leading to the whole council being elected in those years. The number of councillors was reduced from 42 to 33 for the 2015 election.

- 1973 Wyre Forest District Council election
- 1975 Wyre Forest District Council election
- 1976 Wyre Forest District Council election
- 1978 Wyre Forest District Council election
- 1979 Wyre Forest District Council election (New ward boundaries)
- 1980 Wyre Forest District Council election
- 1982 Wyre Forest District Council election
- 1983 Wyre Forest District Council election
- 1984 Wyre Forest District Council election
- 1986 Wyre Forest District Council election (District boundary changes took place but the number of seats remained the same)
- 1987 Wyre Forest District Council election
- 1988 Wyre Forest District Council election

Year	Conservative	Labour	Independent	Health Concern	UK Independence Party	Liberal	Liberal Democrats	Green	Vacant	Notes
1990	10	16	3	0	0	0	13	0	0	
1991	8	21	3	0	0	0	10	0	0	District boundary changes took place but the number of seats remained the same
1992	9	21	1	0	0	0	11	0	0	
1994	8	18	1	0	0	0	15	0	0	
1995	6	20	1	0	0	0	15	0	0	
1996	3	26	2	0	0	3	8	0	0	
1998	4	28	1	0	0	3	6	0	0	
1999	5	18	5	7	0	3	4	0	0	
2000	5	11	0	19	0	3	4	0	0	
2002	6	5	2	21	0	5	2	1	1	
2003	9	4	1	19	0	7	2	0	0	
2004	19	4	1	8	0	8	2	0	0	New ward boundaries
2006	18	4	2	9	0	7	2	0	0	
2007	18	3	2	10	0	7	2	0	0	
2008	22	2	0	10	0	6	2	0	0	
2010	23	3	1	8	0	5	2	0	0	
2011	24	6	3	4	0	5	0	0	0	
2012	20	8	2	8	0	4	0	0	0	
2014	15	9	4	7	5	2	0	0	0	
2015	23	3	3	2	1	1	0	0	0	New ward boundaries
2016	22	4	3	2	0	0	2	0	0	
2018	21	4	3	2	0	0	3	0	0	
2019	14	2	5	8	0	0	3	0	0	Change to all out elections
2023	20	4	6	0	0	0	2	1		

== District result maps ==
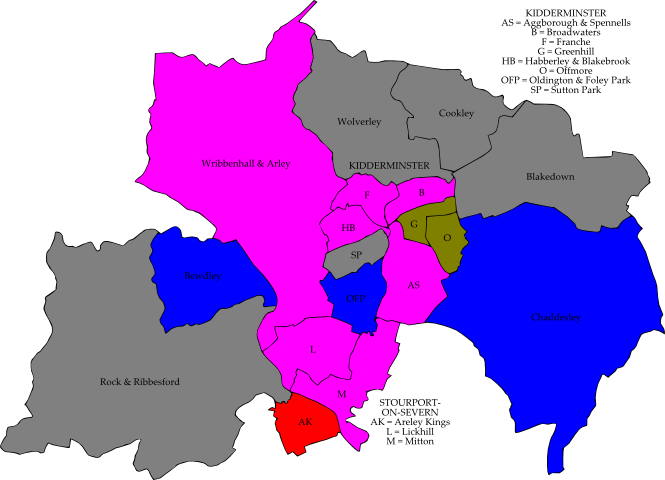
2002 results map

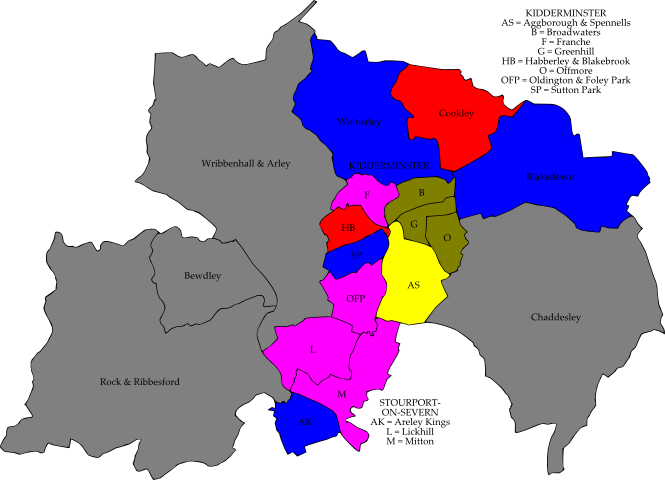
2003 results map

2004 results map

2006 results map

2007 results map

2008 results map

2010 results map

2011 results map

2012 results map

2014 results map

2015 results map

2016 results map

2018 results map

2019 results map

2023 results map

== By-election results ==
By-elections occur when seats become vacant between council elections. Below is a summary of recent by-elections; full by-election results can be found by clicking on the by-election name.

By-election	Date	Incumbent party	Winning party
Broadwater	12 December 1996	Labour	Labour
Oldington and Foley Park	16 October 1997	Labour	Labour
Oldington and Foley Park by-election	3 December 1998	Liberal Democrats	Labour
Chaddesley by-election	18 February 1999	Conservative	Conservative
Sutton Park by-election	13 June 2002	Liberal Democrats	Conservative
Aggborough and Spennells by-election	27 October 2005	Conservative	Conservative
Lickhill by-election	10 September 2009	Health Concern	Health Concern
Areley Kings by-election	10 December 2009	Conservative	Labour
Blakebrook and Habberley South by-election	24 September 2015	Conservative	Conservative
Mitton by-election	4 May 2017	Conservative	Conservative
Bewdley and Rock by-election	20 September 2018	Conservative	Conservative
Franche and Habberley North by-election	30 November 2021	Health Concern	Conservative
Franche and Habberley North by-election	16 June 2022	Health Concern	Conservative
