= Boroughs incorporated in England and Wales 1835–1882 =

The Municipal Corporations Act 1835 reformed 178 existing boroughs. It also allowed for further towns to submit petitions for the grant of a charter of incorporation as a municipal borough. There were 62 such incorporations before the 1835 act was repealed and replaced by the Municipal Corporations Act 1882.

== 1836 – The 178 reformed boroughs ==
Municipal borough	County	Created	Abolished	Successor(s)
Beaumaris MB	Anglesey	1836	1974	Anglesey - Ynys Môn
Bedford MB	Bedfordshire	1836	1974	Bedford
Abingdon MB	Berkshire	1836	1974	Vale of White Horse
Maidenhead MB	Berkshire	1836	1974	Windsor and Maidenhead
New Windsor MB	Berkshire	1836	1974	Windsor and Maidenhead
Newbury MB	Berkshire	1836	1974	Newbury
Reading MB	Berkshire	1836	1889	Reading CB
Wallingford MB	Berkshire	1836	1974	South Oxfordshire
Brecon MB	Brecknockshire	1836	1974	Brecknock
Buckingham MB	Buckinghamshire	1836	1974	Aylesbury Vale
Chepping Wycombe MB (1836-1946), High Wycombe MB (1946-74)	Buckinghamshire	1836	1974	Wycombe
Carnarvon MB	Caernarfonshire	1836	1974	Arfon
Pwllheli MB	Caernarfonshire	1836	1974	Dwyfor
Cambridge MB	Cambridgeshire (1836-1965), Cambridgeshire and Isle of Ely (1965-74)	1836	1974	Cambridge
Wisbech MB	Cambridgeshire (1836-89), Isle of Ely (1889-1965), Cambridgeshire and Isle of Ely (1965-74)	1836	1974	Fenland
Aberystwyth MB	Cardiganshire	1836	1974	Ceredigion
Cardigan MB	Cardiganshire	1836	1974	Ceredigion
Carmarthen MB	Carmarthenshire	1836	1974	Carmarthen
Llandovery MB	Carmarthenshire	1836	1974	Dinefwr
Chester MB	Cheshire	1836	1889	Chester CB
Congleton MB	Cheshire	1836	1974	Congleton
Macclesfield MB	Cheshire	1836	1974	Macclesfield
Stockport MB	Cheshire and Lancashire	1836	1889	Stockport CB
Bodmin MB	Cornwall	1836	1974	North Cornwall
Falmouth MB	Cornwall	1836	1974	Carrick
Helston MB	Cornwall	1836	1974	Kerrier
Launceston MB, Launceston otherwise Dunheved MB	Cornwall	1836	1974	North Cornwall
Liskeard MB	Cornwall	1836	1974	Caradon
Penryn MB	Cornwall	1836	1974	Carrick
Penzance MB	Cornwall	1836	1974	Penwith
St Ives MB	Cornwall	1836	1974	Penwith
Truro MB	Cornwall	1836	1974	Carrick
Durham MB	County Durham	1836	1974	Durham
Gateshead MB	County Durham	1836	1889	Gateshead CB
Stockton-on-Tees MB	County Durham	1836	1968	Teesside CB
Sunderland MB	County Durham	1836	1889	Sunderland CB
Carlisle MB	Cumberland	1836	1915	Carlisle CB
Denbigh MB	Denbighshire	1836	1974	Glyndŵr
Ruthin MB	Denbighshire	1836	1974	Glyndŵr
Chesterfield MB	Derbyshire	1836	1974	Chesterfield
Derby MB	Derbyshire	1836	1889	Derby CB
Barnstaple MB	Devon	1836	1974	North Devon
Bideford MB	Devon	1836	1974	Torridge
Dartmouth MB, Clifton-Dartmouth-Hardness MB	Devon	1836	1974	South Hams
Exeter MB	Devon	1836	1889	Exeter CB
Great Torrington MB	Devon	1836	1974	Torridge
Plymouth MB	Devon	1836	1889	Plymouth CB
South Molton MB	Devon	1836	1968	absorbed by South Molton RD (Rural Borough)
Tiverton MB	Devon	1836	1974	Tiverton
Totnes MB	Devon	1836	1974	South Hams
Blandford Forum MB	Dorset	1836	1974	North Dorset
Bridport MB	Dorset	1836	1974	West Dorset
Dorchester MB	Dorset	1836	1974	West Dorset
Lyme Regis MB	Dorset	1836	1974	West Dorset
Poole MB	Dorset	1836	1974	Poole
Shaftesbury MB	Dorset	1836	1974	North Dorset
Weymouth and Melcombe Regis MB	Dorset	1836	1974	Weymouth and Portland
Colchester MB	Essex	1836	1974	Colchester
Harwich MB	Essex	1836	1974	Tendring
Maldon MB	Essex	1836	1974	Maldon
Saffron Walden MB	Essex	1836	1974	Uttlesford
Flint MB	Flintshire	1836	1974	Delyn
Cardiff MB	Glamorganshire	1836	1889	Cardiff CB
Neath MB	Glamorganshire	1836	1974	Neath
Swansea MB	Glamorganshire	1836	1889	Swansea CB
Gloucester MB	Gloucestershire	1836	1889	Gloucester CB
Tewkesbury MB	Gloucestershire	1836	1974	Tewkesbury
Bristol MB	Gloucestershire and Somerset	1836	1889	Bristol CB
Andover MB	Hampshire	1836	1974	Test Valley
Basingstoke MB	Hampshire	1836	1974	Basingstoke
Lymington MB	Hampshire	1836	1974	New Forest
Portsmouth MB	Hampshire	1836	1889	Portsmouth CB
Romsey MB	Hampshire	1836	1974	Test Valley
Southampton MB	Hampshire	1836	1889	Southampton CB
Winchester MB	Hampshire	1836	1974	Winchester
Newport MB	Hampshire (1836-89), Isle of Wight (1889-1974)	1836	1974	Medina
Hereford MB	Herefordshire	1836	1974	Hereford
Leominster MB	Herefordshire	1836	1974	Leominster
Hertford MB	Hertfordshire	1836	1974	East Hertfordshire
St Albans MB	Hertfordshire	1836	1974	St Albans
Godmanchester MB	Huntingdonshire	1836	1961	Huntingdon and Godmanchester MB
Huntingdon MB	Huntingdonshire	1836	1961	Huntingdon and Godmanchester MB
Canterbury MB	Kent	1836	1889	Canterbury CB
Deal MB	Kent	1836	1974	Dover
Dover MB	Kent	1836	1974	Dover
Faversham MB	Kent	1836	1974	Swale
Folkestone MB	Kent	1836	1974	Shepway
Gravesend MB	Kent	1836	1974	Gravesham
Hythe MB	Kent	1836	1974	Shepway
Maidstone MB	Kent	1836	1974	Maidstone
Rochester MB	Kent	1836	1974	Rochester-upon-Medway
Sandwich MB	Kent	1836	1974	Dover
Tenterden MB	Kent	1836	1974	Ashford
Clitheroe MB	Lancashire	1836	1974	Ribble Valley
Lancaster MB	Lancashire	1836	1974	Lancaster
Liverpool MB	Lancashire	1836	1889	Liverpool CB
Preston MB	Lancashire	1836	1889	Preston CB
Wigan MB	Lancashire	1836	1889	Wigan CB
Leicester MB	Leicestershire	1836	1889	Leicester CB
Boston MB	Lincolnshire (1836-89), Lincolnshire, Parts of Holland (1889-1974)	1836	1974	Boston
Grantham MB	Lincolnshire (1836-89), Lincolnshire, Parts of Kesteven (1889-1974)	1836	1974	South Kesteven
Stamford MB	Lincolnshire (1836-89), Lincolnshire, Parts of Kesteven (1889-1974)	1836	1974	South Kesteven
Great Grimsby MB	Lincolnshire (1836-89), Lincolnshire, Parts of Lindsey (1889-91)	1836	1891	Grimsby CB
Lincoln MB	Lincolnshire	1836	1889	Lincoln CB
Louth MB	Lincolnshire (1836-89), Lincolnshire, Parts of Lindsey (1889-1974)	1836	1974	East Lindsey
Monmouth MB	Monmouthshire	1836	1974	Monmouth
Newport MB	Monmouthshire	1836	1891	Newport CB
Llanidloes MB	Montgomeryshire	1836	1974	Montgomery
Welshpool MB	Montgomeryshire	1836	1974	Montgomery
King's Lynn MB, Lynn Regis MB	Norfolk	1836	1974	West Norfolk
Norwich MB	Norfolk	1836	1889	Norwich CB
Great Yarmouth MB	Norfolk and Suffolk	1836	1889	Yarmouth CB
Thetford MB	Norfolk and Suffolk (1836-89), Norfolk (1889-1974)	1836	1974	Breckland
Daventry MB	Northamptonshire	1836	1974	Daventry
Northampton MB	Northamptonshire	1836	1889	Northampton CB
Berwick-upon-Tweed MB	Northumberland	1836	1974	Berwick-upon-Tweed
Morpeth MB	Northumberland	1836	1974	Castle Morpeth
Newcastle upon Tyne MB	Northumberland	1836	1889	Newcastle upon Tyne CB
East Retford MB	Nottinghamshire	1836	1974	Bassetlaw
Newark MB	Nottinghamshire	1836	1974	Newark
Nottingham MB	Nottinghamshire	1836	1889	Nottingham CB
Chipping Norton MB	Oxfordshire	1836	1974	West Oxfordshire
Oxford MB	Oxfordshire	1836	1889	Oxford CB
Banbury MB	Oxfordshire	1836	1974	Cherwell
Haverfordwest MB	Pembrokeshire	1836	1974	Preseli
Pembroke MB	Pembrokeshire	1836	1974	South Pembrokeshire
Tenby MB	Pembrokeshire	1836	1974	South Pembrokeshire
Bridgnorth MB	Shropshire	1836	1967	absorbed by Bridgnorth RD (Rural Borough)
Ludlow MB	Shropshire	1836	1967	absorbed by Ludlow RD (Rural Borough)
Oswestry MB	Shropshire	1836	1967	absorbed by Oswestry RD (Rural Borough)
Shrewsbury MB	Shropshire	1836	1974	Shrewsbury
Wenlock MB, Much Wenlock MB	Shropshire	1836	1967	absorbed by Bridgnorth RD (Rural Borough)
Bath MB	Somerset	1836	1889	Bath CB
Bridgwater MB	Somerset	1836	1974	Sedgemoor
Chard MB	Somerset	1836	1974	Yeovil
Glastonbury MB	Somerset	1836	1974	Mendip
Wells MB	Somerset	1836	1974	Mendip
Lichfield MB	Staffordshire	1836	1974	Lichfield
Newcastle-under-Lyme MB	Staffordshire	1836	1974	Newcastle-under-Lyme
Stafford MB	Staffordshire	1836	1974	Stafford
Walsall MB	Staffordshire	1836	1889	Walsall CB
Tamworth MB	Staffordshire and Warwickshire (1836-89), Staffordshire (1889-1974)	1836	1974	Tamworth
Ipswich MB	Suffolk	1836	1889	Ipswich CB
Sudbury MB	Suffolk and Essex (1836-89), West Suffolk (1889-1974)	1836	1974	Babergh
Beccles MB	Suffolk (1836-89), East Suffolk (1889-1974)	1836	1974	Waveney
Eye MB	Suffolk (1836-89), East Suffolk (1889-1974)	1836	1974	Mid Suffolk
Southwold MB	Suffolk (1836-89), East Suffolk (1889-1974)	1836	1974	Waveney
Bury St Edmunds MB	Suffolk (1836-89), West Suffolk (1889-1974)	1836	1974	St Edmundsbury
Godalming MB	Surrey	1836	1974	Waverley
Guildford MB	Surrey	1836	1974	Guildford
Kingston upon Thames MB	Surrey	1836	1965	Kingston upon Thames
Hastings MB	Sussex	1836	1889	Hastings CB
Rye MB	Sussex (1836-89), East Sussex (1889-1974)	1836	1974	Rother
Arundel MB	Sussex (1836-89), West Sussex (1889-1974)	1836	1974	Arun
Chichester MB	Sussex (1836-89), West Sussex (1889-1974)	1836	1974	Chichester
Coventry MB	Warwickshire	1836	1889	Coventry CB
Stratford-on-Avon MB	Warwickshire	1836	1974	Stratford-on-Avon
Warwick MB	Warwickshire	1836	1974	Warwick
Kendal MB	Westmorland	1836	1974	South Lakeland
Calne MB	Wiltshire	1836	1974	North Wiltshire
Chippenham MB	Wiltshire	1836	1974	North Wiltshire
Devizes MB	Wiltshire	1836	1974	Kennet
Marlborough MB	Wiltshire	1836	1974	Kennet
Salisbury MB, New Sarum MB	Wiltshire	1836	1974	Salisbury
Bewdley MB	Worcestershire	1836	1974	Wyre Forest
Droitwich MB	Worcestershire	1836	1974	Wychavon
Evesham MB	Worcestershire	1836	1974	Wychavon
Kidderminster MB	Worcestershire	1836	1974	Wyre Forest
Worcester MB	Worcestershire	1836	1889	Worcester CB
Beverley MB	Yorkshire (1836-89), East Riding of Yorkshire (1889-1974)	1836	1974	Beverley
Kingston upon Hull MB	Yorkshire	1836	1889	Kingston upon Hull CB
York MB	Yorkshire	1836	1889	York CB
Richmond MB	Yorkshire (1836-89), North Riding of Yorkshire (1889-1974)	1836	1974	Richmondshire
Scarborough MB	Yorkshire (1836-89), North Riding of Yorkshire (1889-1974)	1836	1974	Scarborough
Doncaster MB	Yorkshire (1836-89), West Riding of Yorkshire (1889-1927)	1836	1927	Doncaster CB
Leeds MB	Yorkshire	1836	1889	Leeds CB
Pontefract MB	Yorkshire (1836-89), West Riding of Yorkshire (1889-1974)	1836	1974	Wakefield
Ripon MB	Yorkshire (1836-89), West Riding of Yorkshire (1889-1974)	1836	1974	Harrogate

== 1837-82 ==
Up to 1851, eighteen boroughs were incorporated: sixteen towns that had been enfranchised by the Reform Act 1832 and two of the boroughs unreformed in 1835 were brought under the act.

In the following years a further seven unreformed boroughs were incorporated and 39 other towns became municipalities. Most of the newly incorporated towns were rapidly growing industrial centres. A number of coastal resorts were created boroughs, reflecting the growth of seaside tourism, and in 1875 Leamington Spa became the first inland spa resort to gain incorporation.

Municipal Borough	County	Created	Abolished	Successor(s)
Devonport MB†	Devon	1837	1889	Devonport CB
Bolton MB†	Lancashire	1838	1889	Bolton CB
Birmingham MB†	Warwickshire	1838	1889	Birmingham CB
Manchester MB†	Lancashire	1838	1889	Manchester CB
Sheffield MB†	Yorkshire	1843	1889	Sheffield CB
Salford MB†	Lancashire	1844	1889	Salford CB
Honiton MB‡	Devon	1846	1974	East Devon
Ashton-under-Lyne MB†	Lancashire	1847	1974	Tameside
Bradford MB†	Yorkshire	1847	1889	Bradford CB
Warrington MB†	Lancashire and Cheshire (1847-89), Lancashire (1889-1900)	1847	1900	Warrington CB
Halifax MB†	Yorkshire	1848	1889	Halifax CB
Wakefield MB†	Yorkshire (1848-89), West Riding of Yorkshire (1889-1915)	1848	1915	Wakefield CB
Wolverhampton MB†	Staffordshire	1848	1889	Wolverhampton CB
Oldham MB†	Lancashire	1849	1889	Oldham CB
Tynemouth MB†	Northumberland	1849	1904	Tynemouth CB
Hartlepool MB‡	County Durham	1850	1967	Hartlepool CB
South Shields MB†	County Durham	1850	1889	South Shields CB
Blackburn MB†	Lancashire	1851	1889	Blackburn CB
Middlesbrough MB	Yorkshire	1853	1889	Middlesbrough CB
Brighton MB†	Sussex	1854	1889	Brighton CB
Yeovil MB‡	Somerset	1854	1974	Yeovil
Rochdale MB†	Lancashire	1856	1889	Rochdale CB
Hanley MB	Staffordshire	1857	1889	Hanley CB
Margate MB	Kent	1857	1974	Thanet
Stalybridge MB	Cheshire and Lancashire (1857-89), Cheshire (1889-1974)	1857	1974	Tameside
Wrexham MB	Denbighshire	1857	1974	Wrexham Maelor
Hedon MB‡	Yorkshire (1861-89), East Riding of Yorkshire (1889-1974)	1861	1974	Holderness
Aberavon MB‡	Glamorganshire	1861	1921	Port Talbot MB
Burnley MB	Lancashire	1861	1889	Burnley CB
Dewsbury MB	Yorkshire (1862-89), West Riding of Yorkshire (1889-1913)	1862	1913	Dewsbury CB
Reigate MB‡	Surrey	1863	1974	Reigate and Banstead
Dunstable MB‡	Bedfordshire	1864	1974	South Bedfordshire
Dudley MB†	Worcestershire	1865	1889	Dudley CB
Longton MB	Staffordshire	1865	1910	Stoke on Trent CB
Glossop MB	Derbyshire	1866	1974	High Peak
Southport MB	Lancashire	1866	1905	Southport CB
Barrow-in-Furness MB	Lancashire	1867	1889	Barrow-in-Furness CB
Darlington MB	County Durham	1867	1915	Darlington CB
Batley MB	Yorkshire (1869-89), West Riding of Yorkshire (1889-1974)	1868	1974	Kirklees
Bootle cum Linacre MB	Lancashire	1868	1889	Bootle CB
Huddersfield MB†	Yorkshire	1868	1889	Huddersfield CB
Ryde MB	Hampshire (1868-89), Isle of Wight (1889-1974)	1868	1974	Medina
St Helens MB	Lancashire	1868	1889	St Helens CB
Barnsley MB	Yorkshire (1869-89), West Riding of Yorkshire (1889-1913)	1869	1913	Barnsley CB
Rotherham MB	Yorkshire (1871-89), West Riding of Yorkshire (1889-1902)	1871	1902	Rotherham CB
Peterborough MB	Northamptonshire and Huntingdonshire (1874-89), Soke of Peterborough (1889-1965), Huntingdon and Peterborough (1965-74)	1874	1974	Peterborough
St Ives MB	Huntingdonshire (1874-1965), Huntingdon and Peterborough (1965-74)	1874	1974	Huntingdon
Stoke upon Trent MB†	Staffordshire	1874	1910	Stoke on Trent CB
Jarrow MB	County Durham	1875	1974	South Tyneside
Royal Leamington Spa MB	Warwickshire	1875	1974	Warwick
Blackpool MB	Lancashire	1876	1904	Blackpool CB
Bury MB†	Lancashire	1876	1889	Bury CB
Cheltenham MB†	Gloucestershire	1876	1974	Cheltenham
Luton MB	Bedfordshire	1876	1964	Luton CB
Birkenhead MB	Cheshire	1877	1889	Birkenhead CB
Conwy MB‡	Caernarfonshire	1877	1974	District of Aberconwy
Crewe MB	Cheshire	1877	1974	Crewe and Nantwich
Taunton MB	Somerset	1877	1974	Taunton Deane
Accrington MB	Lancashire	1878	1974	Hyndburn
Burslem MB	Staffordshire	1878	1910	Stoke on Trent CB
Burton upon Trent MB	Staffordshire and Derbyshire (1878-89), Staffordshire (1889-1901)	1878	1901	Burton upon Trent CB
Darwen MB	Lancashire	1878	1974	Blackburn
Chorley MB	Lancashire	1881	1974	Chorley
Heywood MB	Lancashire	1881	1974	Rochdale
Hyde MB	Cheshire	1881	1974	Tameside
Lewes MB‡	Sussex (1881-89), East Sussex (1889-1974)	1881	1974	Lewes

† Boroughs enfranchised 1832 ‡ Borough unreformed in 1835
