= 2019 Wyre Forest District Council election =

2019 UK local government election

- 2 May 2019

All 33 seats to Wyre Forest District Council 17 seats needed for a majority

	First party	Second party	Third party
Party	Conservative	Health Concern	Independent
Last election	23 seats, 41.2%	2 seats, 12.9%	3 seats, 5.1%
Seats before	21	2	3
Seats won	14	8	5
Seat change	▼9	▲6	▲2
Popular vote	17,827	9,763	5,983
Percentage	31.6%	17.3%	10.6%
Swing	▼9.6%	▲4.4%	▲5.5%
	Fourth party	Fifth party	Sixth party
Party	Liberal Democrats	Labour	Green
Last election	0 seats, 8.6%	4 seats, 26.5%	0 seats, 3.9%
Seats before	3	4	0
Seats won	3	2	1
Seat change	▲3	▼2	▲1
Popular vote	5,919	9,053	4,325
Percentage	10.5%	16.1%	7.7%
Swing	▲1.9%	▼10.4%	▲3.8%
Council control before election
Conservative
Council control after election
No overall control

The 2019 Wyre Forest District Council election took place on 2 May 2019 to elect members of Wyre Forest District Council in Worcestershire, England. They were held on the same day as other local elections.

== Background ==
At the previous election, the Conservative Party had control with 21 councillors with the closest party being the Labour Party who had 4 councillors.

== Summary ==
=== Election result ===
2019 Wyre Forest District Council election
Party	Candidates	Seats	Gains	Losses	Net gain/loss	Seats %	Votes %	Votes	+/−
Conservative	27	14	1	10	▼9	42.4	31.6	17,827	–9.6
Health Concern	14	8	7	1	▲6	24.2	17.3	9,763	+4.4
Independent	5	5	2	0	▲2	15.2	10.6	5,983	+5.5
Liberal Democrats	14	3	3	0	▲3	9.1	10.5	5,919	+1.9
Labour	21	2	2	4	▼2	6.1	16.1	9,053	–10.4
Green	11	1	1	0	▲1	3.0	7.7	4,325	+3.8
UKIP	10	0	0	1	▼1	0.0	6.2	3,491	+4.4

The Conservatives lost their majority by losing 7 councillors taking their number to 14, while Health Concern and independent councillors made substantial gains while Labour halved their number of councillors from 4 to 2. Vicky Caulfield was the only Green Party Councillor to be elected in the district.

Following the elections, a coalition was formed between the Independent Health Concern, Independents, Liberal Democrats, Labour and Green councillors.

== Council Composition ==
=== Before the election ===
21	4	3	3	2
Conservatives	Labour	Liberal Democrats	Independent	Independent Community and Health Concern

=== After the election ===
14	8	5	3	2	1
Conservatives	Independent Community and Health Concern	Independent	Liberal Democrats	Labour	Green

== Ward results ==
=== Aggborough & Spennells ===
Aggborough & Spennells 2019
Party	Candidate	Votes	%	±%
Independent	Helen Elizabeth Dyke*	1,583	67.5	
Independent	Peter Dyke*	1,455	62.0	
Independent	John Cedric Aston*	1,277	54.5	
Conservative	Tony Andrew Muir	476	20.3	
Health Concern	Keith Roderick Robertson	398	17.0	
Green	Maxine Elizabeth Watkins	322	13.7	
Labour	George Price	262	11.2	
UKIP	Warren Gregory Rogers	256	10.9	
Registered electors		6,506		
Turnout		2,345	36.14	
Rejected ballots		6	0.3	
Independent hold		Swing		
Independent hold		Swing		
Independent hold		Swing		

Helen Elizabeth Dyke, Peter Dyke and John Cedric Aston were elected.

=== Areley Kings & Riverside ===
Areley Kings & Riverside 2019
Party	Candidate	Votes	%	±%
Health Concern	Claire June Powell-Barnett	724	37.7	
Health Concern	John William Roland Thomas	724	37.7	
Conservative	Ken Henderson*	608	31.7	
Conservative	Lin Henderson*	564	29.4	
Conservative	Gary Martyn Talbot	507	26.4	
Labour	Vi Higgs	473	24.6	
Labour	Cliff Brewer	398	20.7	
Labour	Rob Lloyd	395	20.6	
UKIP	Nick Jolly	328	17.1	
Green	Luke Thomas Clasper	300	15.6	
Liberal Democrats	Anita Ellen Beavis	99	5.2	
Registered electors		6,380		
Turnout		1,920	30.22	
Rejected ballots		8	0.4	
Health Concern gain from Conservative		Swing		
Health Concern gain from Labour		Swing		
Conservative hold		Swing		

Claire June Powell-Barnett, John William Roland Thomas and Ken Henderson were elected.

=== Bewdley & Rock ===
Bewdley & Rock 2019
Party	Candidate	Votes	%	±%
Conservative	Anna Coleman	969	39.8	
Independent	Calne Elaine Edginton-White	947	38.9	
Conservative	Roger Hugh Coleman	866	35.6	
Conservative	Becky Vale	852	35.0	
Labour	Rod Stanczyszyn	821	33.7	
Green	John Edward Davis	727	29.8	
UKIP	Paul Stephen Rogers	428	17.6	
Registered electors		6,848		
Turnout		2,436	35.78	
Rejected ballots		14	0.6	
Conservative hold		Swing		
Independent gain from Conservative		Swing		
Conservative hold		Swing		

Anna Coleman, Calne Elaine Edginton-White and Roger Hugh Coleman were elected.

=== Blakebrook & Habberley South ===
Blakebrook & Habberley South 2019
Party	Candidate	Votes	%	±%
Conservative	Tracey Onslow-Fage	752	39.9	
Green	Vicky Caulfield	645	34.2	
Labour	Leigh Andrew John Robert Whitehouse	636	33.7	
Conservative	Juliet Denise Smith*	599	31.8	
Conservative	John Arthur Hart	577	30.6	
Liberal Democrats	David Eric Hollyoak	497	26.4	
UKIP	George Anthony Connolly	393	20.8	
Registered electors		6,689		
Turnout		1,885	28.29	
Rejected ballots		7	0.4	
Conservative hold		Swing		
Green gain from Conservative		Swing		
Labour gain from Conservative		Swing		

Tracey Onslow, Vicky Caulfield and Leigh Andrew John Robert Whitehouse were elected.

=== Broadwaters ===
Broadwaters 2019
Party	Candidate	Votes	%	±%
Independent	Mary Alice Rayner*	721	40.3	
Health Concern	Peter Winston Montgomery Young	682	38.1	
Labour	Sarah Elizabeth Nicole Rook	481	26.9	
Labour	Gareth David Webster	461	25.8	
Liberal Democrats	Abdur Rizan Razzak	375	21.0	
UKIP	Bill Hopkins	370	20.7	
Conservative	Steve Walker	365	20.4	
Green	Anita Ostrowski	332	18.6	
Liberal Democrats	Clare Ramona Cassidy	304	17.0	
Liberal Democrats	Simon Ford	227	12.7	
Registered electors		6,604		
Turnout		1,788	27.21	
Rejected ballots		9	0.5	
Independent gain from Conservative		Swing		
Health Concern hold		Swing		
Labour gain from UKIP		Swing		

Mary Alice Rayner, Peter Winston Montgomery Young and Sarah Elizabeth Nicole Rook were elected.

=== Foley Park & Hoobrook ===
Foley Park & Hoobrook 2019
Party	Candidate	Votes	%	±%
Conservative	Nathan John Desmond*	788	40.9	
Conservative	Sally Jane Chambers*	728	37.8	
Conservative	Nicky Gale	647	33.6	
Health Concern	Sue Meekings	625	32.4	
Green	Dave Finch	404	21.0	
UKIP	Craig Ashley Leonard	375	19.5	
Labour	John Beckingham	328	17.0	
Labour	Gerald Crumpton	299	15.5	
Liberal Democrats	Adrian Stanley Beavis	288	14.9	
Liberal Democrats	Leia Rachel Devon Beavis	235	12.2	
Liberal Democrats	Heidi Ruth Worth	226	11.7	
Registered electors		7,360		
Turnout		1,928	26.30	
Rejected ballots		8	0.4	
Conservative hold		Swing		
Conservative hold		Swing		
Conservative gain from Labour		Swing		

Nathan John Desmond, Sally Jane Chambers and Nicky Gale were elected.

=== Franche & Habberley North ===
Franche & Habberley North 2019
Party	Candidate	Votes	%	±%
Health Concern	Susie Griffiths	956	42.6	
Health Concern	Graham William Ballinger	890	39.7	
Health Concern	Anna Louise L'Huillier	651	29.0	
Labour	Nigel Knowles*	628	28.0	
Conservative	Mike Cheeseman	628	28.0	
Conservative	David Richard Ross	536	23.9	
Labour	Mary Clive McDonnell	502	22.4	
UKIP	Tony Whitmore	338	15.1	
Green	Brett Raymond Caulfield	318	14.2	
Liberal Democrats	Oliver Yasha Walker	311	13.9	
Registered electors		7,552		
Turnout		2,243	29.81	
Rejected ballots		8	0.4	
Health Concern gain from Conservative		Swing		
Health Concern gain from Conservative		Swing		
Health Concern gain from Labour		Swing		

Susie Griffiths, Graham William Ballinger and Anna Louise L'Huillier were elected.

=== Lickhill ===
Lickhill 2019
Party	Candidate	Votes	%	±%
Health Concern	Dixon Raymond Sheppard	263	37.2	
Conservative	David Little*	241	34.1	
Labour	Carol Gwyneth Warren	109	15.4	
Liberal Democrats	Chris Pratt	63	8.9	
Green	Nick Atkinson	31	4.4	
Registered electors		2,171		
Turnout		707	33.21	
Rejected ballots		14	1.9	
Health Concern gain from Conservative		Swing		

Dixon Raymond Sheppard was elected.

=== Mitton ===
Mitton 2019
Party	Candidate	Votes	%	±%
Health Concern	Nicky Martin	1,013	52.8	
Conservative	Chris Rogers*	662	34.5	
Conservative	Berenice Susan Dawes	647	33.7	
Conservative	Howard Stuart Williams	514	26.8	
Green	Phil Oliver	426	22.2	
Labour	Jackie Griffiths	411	21.4	
Labour	Jill Hawes	399	20.8	
Labour	Daniel Colin Rees	365	19.0	
Liberal Democrats	Rachel Louise Akathiotis	225	11.7	
Registered electors		7,333		
Turnout		1,920	26.65	
Rejected ballots		34	1.7	
Health Concern gain from Conservative		Swing		
Conservative hold		Swing		
Conservative hold		Swing		

Nicky Martin, Chris Rogers and Berenice Susan Dawes were elected.

=== Offmore & Comberton ===
Offmore & Comberton 2019
Party	Candidate	Votes	%	±%
Liberal Democrats	Frances Mary Oborski*	1,183	56.6	
Liberal Democrats	Shazu Miah	960	45.9	
Liberal Democrats	Alan John Totty	926	44.3	
UKIP	Dave Field	482	23.1	
Conservative	Kevin George Gale	429	20.5	
Labour	Nick Savage	394	18.9	
Conservative	Matthew Francis Viner	384	18.4	
Registered electors		7,349		
Turnout		2,090	28.67	
Rejected ballots		17	0.8	
Liberal Democrats gain from Liberal		Swing		
Liberal Democrats gain from Conservative		Swing		
Liberal Democrats gain from Health Concern		Swing		

Frances Mary Oborski, Shazu Miah and Alan John Totty were elected.

=== Wribbenhall & Arley ===
Wribbenhall & Arley 2019
Party	Candidate	Votes	%	±%
Conservative	Paul Harrison	648	42.0	
Conservative	John Frederick Byng	631	40.9	
Health Concern	Liz Davies	561	36.3	
Green	Megan Jane Williams	397	25.7	
Labour	Dan Crampton	392	25.4	
UKIP	Christopher Robert Wood	205	13.3	
Registered electors		4,306		
Turnout		1,544	36.14	
Rejected ballots		12	0.8	
Conservative hold		Swing		
Conservative hold		Swing		

Paul Harrison and John Frederick Byng were elected.

=== Wyre Forest Rural ===
Wyre Forest Rural 2019
Party	Candidate	Votes	%	±%
Conservative	Ian David Hardiman*	1,136	42.1	
Conservative	Marcus John Hart*	1,115	41.3	
Conservative	Lisa Joan Jones	958	35.5	
Health Concern	Adrian Mark Carloss	881	32.7	
Health Concern	Vince Smith MBE	777	28.8	
Health Concern	Harry Kenelm Dakeyne Grove	618	22.9	
Labour	Chris Nicholls	520	19.3	
Labour	David Paul Jones	484	17.9	
Green	Kate Spohrer	423	15.7	
UKIP	Steven Harrington	316	11.7	
Labour	Barry Mcfarland	295	10.9	
Registered electors		7,167		
Turnout		2,698	37.76	
Rejected ballots		8	0.3	
Conservative hold		Swing		
Conservative hold		Swing		
Conservative hold		Swing		

Ian David Hardiman, Marcus John Hart and Lisa Joan Jones were elected.

== Changes 2019–2023 ==
=== By-elections ===
==== Franche and Habberley North ====
Franche and Habberley North by-election 30 November 2021
Party	Candidate	Votes	%	±%
Conservative	David Ross	564	40.9	+21.1
Labour	Nigel Knowles	372	27.0	+7.2
Liberal Democrats	Oliver Walker	245	17.8	+8.0
Independent	Doug Hine	198	14.4	+14.4
Majority		192	13.9	N/A
Turnout		1,379	18.31	
Registered electors		7,563		
Rejected ballots		6	0.4	
Conservative gain from Health Concern		Swing		

The by-election was triggered by the resignation of Independent Kidderminster Hospital and Health Concern councillor Susie Griffiths.

==== Franche and Habberley North ====
Franche and Habberley North by-election 16 June 2022
Party	Candidate	Votes	%	±%
Conservative	Ben Brookes	826	45.2	
Labour	Kate Sewell	656	35.9	
Liberal Democrats	Oliver Walker	347	19.0	
Majority		170	9.3	N/A
Turnout		1,829	24.51	
Registered electors		7,487		
Rejected ballots		6	0.3	
Conservative gain from Health Concern		Swing		

The by-election was triggered by the resignation of Independent Kidderminster Hospital and Health Concern councillor Anna l'Huillier, who stood down after voicing concerns about the council's newly approved Local Plan.
