= 1998 Wyre Forest District Council election =

1998 UK local government election

The 1998 Wyre Forest District Council election took place on 7 May 1998 to elect members of Wyre Forest District Council in Worcestershire, England. One-third of the council was up for election and the Labour Party stayed in overall control of the council.

After the election, the composition of the council was:

- Labour 28
- Liberal Democrats 6
- Conservative 4
- Liberal 3
- Independent 1

== Background ==
14 seats were contested at the election with Labour defending 7, the Liberal Democrats 4 and the Conservatives, Liberals and independents 1 seat each. Labour was confident of defending the majority of 10 they held over the other parties before the election.

== Election result ==
The results saw Labour increase their majority on the council after gaining two seats, one each from an independent and Liberal Democrat. The other change in the election saw the Conservatives gain a seat in Bewdley ward from the Liberal Democrats. Labour attributed their performance to the capable candidates they had stood but were disappointed by the turnout.

Wyre Forest local election result 1998
| Party | Seats | Gains | Losses | Net gain/loss | Seats % | Votes % | Votes | +/− |
|---|---|---|---|---|---|---|---|---|
| Labour | 9 | 2 | 0 | +2 | 64.3 | | | |
| Liberal Democrats | 2 | 0 | 2 | -2 | 14.3 | | | |
| Conservative | 2 | 1 | 0 | +1 | 14.3 | | | |
| Liberal | 1 | 0 | 0 | 0 | 7.1 | | | |
| Independent | 0 | 0 | 1 | -1 | 0 | | | |

== By-elections between 1998 and 1999 ==
=== Oldington and Foley Park ===
A by-election was held in Oldington and Foley Park after the resignation of Liberal Democrat councillor Adrian Beavis after he was found guilty of false accounting. The seat was gained for Labour by Barry McFarland with a majority of 27 votes over Conservative Justin Tomlinson.

Oldington and Foley Park by-election 3 December 1998
| Party | Candidate | Votes | % | ±% |
|---|---|---|---|---|
| Labour | Barry McFarland | 354 | 35.8 | −6.7 |
| Conservative | Justin Tomlinson | 327 | 33.0 | +27.3 |
| Liberal Democrats | Paul Kendall | 309 | 31.2 | −17.5 |
| Majority | | 27 | 2.7 | |
| Turnout | | 990 | 23.3 | |
| Labour gain from Liberal Democrats | | Swing | | |

=== Chaddesley ===
A by-election was held in Chaddesley after the death of Conservative councillor Harry Purcell.

Chaddesley by-election 18 February 1999
| Party | Candidate | Votes | % | ±% |
|---|---|---|---|---|
| Conservative | | 490 | 89.3 | +6.4 |
| Labour | | 59 | 10.7 | −6.4 |
| Majority | | 431 | 78.5 | |
| Turnout | | 549 | 30.6 | |
| Conservative hold | | Swing | | |
