= Stourport Civic Centre =

Municipal building in Stourport-on-Severn, Worcestershire, England

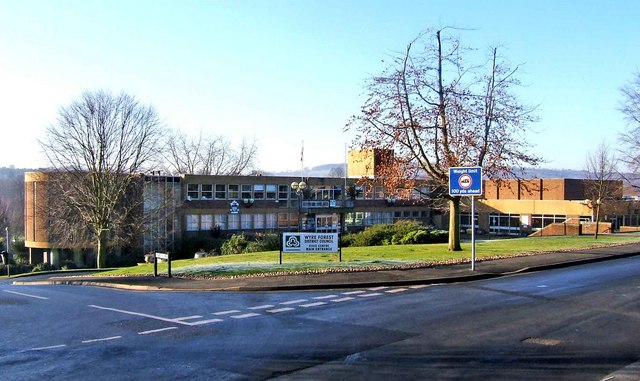
- The building in 2009

- Shown in Worcestershire
- 52.3395°N 2.2832°W
- Location: New Street, Stourport-on-Severn

History
- Built: 1966

Site notes
- Architect(s): Andrews and Hazzard
- Architectural style: Modern style

Stourport Civic Centre is a municipal building in New Street in Stourport-on-Severn, a town in Worcestershire, in England. The building, which is currently used as a public events venue, is owned by a community group.

== History ==
Following significant population growth, largely associated with the status of Stourport-on-Severn as a market town, a local board of health was established for the Lower Mitton area in 1863. The local board decided to remodel the existing single-storey market hall, which stood on the corner of New Street and Bridge Street, and dated from 1833. The remodelling, which involved the construction of a new first floor to accommodate a meeting room for the local board, was carried out in ashlar stone to an Italianate style design and completed in 1866. The design involved an asymmetrical main frontage of eight bays facing onto New Street. It featured a portico, formed by four Doric order columns supporting an entablature, in the fifth bay. The building was fenestrated by round headed windows on the ground floor and by square headed sash windows with cornices on the first floor. At roof level, there was also a prominent cornice.

After the local board was succeeded by Stourport-on-Severn Urban District Council in 1894, the council adopted the town hall as its offices and meeting place. However, by the early 1960s, the town hall was in a dilapidated condition and, in August 1973, it collapsed into the street.

In the early 1960s, having regard to the poor state of the town hall, the council decided to commission a new civic centre. The site selected was open land on the southwest side of the town. A turf-cutting ceremony to start the construction of the new building was held on 27 October 1964. It was designed by Andrews and Hazzard in the modern style, built in brick with a concrete trim at a cost of £198,810 and was officially opened by Charles Lyttelton, 10th Viscount Cobham in May 1966. The new building provided a public assembly hall, a council chamber, and municipal offices for the council. The assembly hall became a popular events venue: the rock band, the N'Betweens, later known as Slade, performed there in December 1967, and the Radio 1 Breakfast with Noel Edmonds was broadcast from there in May 1971.

The civic centre continued to serve as the headquarters of the urban district council for the next eight years and remained the offices and meeting place for the enlarged Wyre Forest District Council which was formed in 1974. Meanwhile, the assembly hall continued to attract significant artists: the singer-songwriter, Robert Plant, appeared there in December 1986.

However, in 2011, the council announced plans to relocate to Wyre Forest House on the outskirts of Kidderminster: the new building was purpose-built for the council and completed in 2012. The council initially proposed disposal of the civic centre site, but it instead transferred ownership to a community group, which continued to operate it as a public events venue. The foyer and facilities in the assembly hall were refurbished in 2014.

== Architecture ==
The building is constructed of brick, with a concrete trim, and bands of windows. It has a central office range, with the assembly hall projecting to the west, and the circular former council chamber projecting to the east.
