= Broadwaters =

Electoral ward in Kidderminster, Worcestershire, England

Coordinates: 52.401°N 2.233°W

Broadwaters is a northeastern area of the town of Kidderminster, Worcestershire, England. An electoral ward of the same name extends south to take in part of the town's northern suburbs; the population of the ward at the 2021 census was 9,274, and its area is 2.358 square kilometres (0.910 sq mi).

The ward elects three members of Wyre Forest District Council and three members of Kidderminster Town Council.
