= 2008 Wyre Forest District Council election =

2008 UK local government election

Map of the results of the 2008 Wyre Forest District Council election. Conservatives in blue, Liberal in orange, Health Concern in pink and Liberal Democrats in yellow. Wards in grey were not contested in 2008.

The 2008 Wyre Forest District Council election took place on 1 May 2008 to elect members of Wyre Forest District Council in Worcestershire, England. One third of the council was up for election and the Conservative Party gained overall control of the council from no overall control.

After the election, the composition of the council was:

- Conservative 22
- Health Concern 10
- Liberal 6
- Labour 2
- Liberal Democrats 2

== Campaign ==
Before the election the Conservatives ran the council as a minority administration with them holding 18 seats, as compared to 10 for Health Concern, 7 Liberals, 3 Labour, 2 Liberal Democrats and 2 independents. 14 seats were contested at the election with the Conservatives defending 6, Liberals 3, independents 2 and Health Concern, Labour and Liberal Democrats 1 each.

The Conservatives needed to gain 4 seats to win a majority, but Health Concern were also hoping to make gains to take over as largest party on the council. Health Concern campaigned on issues including bringing more entertainment facilities to the council area and opposing a new fleet of black taxis, as well as their health policies.

== Election result ==
The Conservatives won a majority on the council for the first time since 1979, after gaining 4 more seats to end the election with 22 councillors, while Health Concern stayed second with 10 seats. Among the Conservative gains were Mumshad Ahmed in Broadwaters ward, who became the first Asian councillor in Wyre Forest, and Julian Phillips in Bewdley and Arley, who became a councillor at the age of 23. Both Labour and the Liberals lost one seat to the Conservatives, while the two independent councillors were defeated.

The Conservatives described the results as an endorsement of their record, while Labour saw them as being due to anti-government feeling. The results were also reported as being a sign that the Conservatives could gain the parliamentary constituency at the next general election from Health Concern's Richard Taylor.

Wyre Forest local election result 2008
| Party | Seats | Gains | Losses | Net gain/loss | Seats % | Votes % | Votes | +/− |
|---|---|---|---|---|---|---|---|---|
| Conservative | 10 | 4 | 0 | +4 | 71.4 | 41.1 | 10,155 | +5.4% |
| Liberal | 2 | 0 | 1 | -1 | 14.3 | 10.4 | 2,579 | +0.0% |
| Health Concern | 1 | 0 | 0 | 0 | 7.1 | 24.7 | 6,100 | -6.1% |
| Liberal Democrats | 1 | 0 | 0 | 0 | 7.1 | 6.3 | 1,565 | +0.3% |
| Labour | 0 | 0 | 1 | -1 | 0 | 13.8 | 3,418 | -2.0% |
| Independent | 0 | 0 | 2 | -2 | 0 | 3.6 | 885 | +3.1% |

== Ward results ==
Aggborough and Spennells
| Party | Candidate | Votes | % | ±% |
|---|---|---|---|---|
| Liberal Democrats | Helen Dyke | 913 | 50.0 | +10.3 |
| Conservative | Chris Rogers | 516 | 28.3 | −4.4 |
| Health Concern | Ken Henderson | 288 | 15.8 | −5.5 |
| Labour | Adrian Sewell | 109 | 6.0 | −0.4 |
| Majority | | 397 | 21.7 | +14.7 |
| Turnout | | 1,826 | 35.0 | −3.1 |
| Liberal Democrats hold | | Swing | | |

Areley Kings
| Party | Candidate | Votes | % | ±% |
|---|---|---|---|---|
| Conservative | Mike Partridge | 666 | 35.2 | +2.1 |
| Labour | James Shaw | 621 | 32.8 | −0.4 |
| Health Concern | Chris Thomas | 552 | 29.2 | −4.5 |
| Liberal | Iain Price | 54 | 2.9 | +2.9 |
| Majority | | 45 | 2.4 | |
| Turnout | | 1,893 | 40.9 | −0.3 |
| Conservative hold | | Swing | | |

Bewdley and Arley
| Party | Candidate | Votes | % | ±% |
|---|---|---|---|---|
| Conservative | Julian Phillips | 917 | 42.1 | −4.3 |
| Independent | Louise Edginton | 518 | 23.8 | +23.8 |
| Health Concern | Derek Killingworth | 435 | 20.0 | −8.3 |
| Labour | Bill Mason | 306 | 14.1 | −4.5 |
| Majority | | 399 | 18.3 | +0.2 |
| Turnout | | 2,176 | 41.0 | +2.0 |
| Conservative gain from Independent | | Swing | | |

Broadwaters
| Party | Candidate | Votes | % | ±% |
|---|---|---|---|---|
| Conservative | Mumshad Ahmed | 617 | 32.5 | +7.2 |
| Health Concern | Linda Candlin | 471 | 24.8 | −16.9 |
| Liberal | Shazu Miah | 445 | 23.4 | +3.2 |
| Labour | Dan Watson | 184 | 9.7 | −3.1 |
| Majority | | 146 | 7.7 | |
| Turnout | | 1,901 | 29.9 | −8.2 |
| Conservative gain from Liberal | | Swing | | |

Franche
| Party | Candidate | Votes | % | ±% |
|---|---|---|---|---|
| Conservative | Jeff Baker | 1,120 | 54.9 | +4.5 |
| Health Concern | Raymond Barber | 541 | 26.5 | −0.3 |
| Labour | Lee Wright | 302 | 14.8 | −3.9 |
| Liberal | Alane Harvey | 77 | 3.8 | −0.4 |
| Majority | | 579 | 28.4 | +4.8 |
| Turnout | | 2,040 | 37.8 | −1.9 |
| Conservative hold | | Swing | | |

Greenhill
| Party | Candidate | Votes | % | ±% |
|---|---|---|---|---|
| Liberal | Graham Ballinger | 919 | 52.2 | −0.1 |
| Health Concern | Lynne Wainewright | 355 | 20.2 | −5.5 |
| Conservative | Ammar Ahmad | 333 | 18.9 | +3.1 |
| Labour | Peter Nielsen | 154 | 8.7 | +8.7 |
| Majority | | 564 | 32.0 | +5.4 |
| Turnout | | 1,761 | 29.5 | −1.6 |
| Liberal hold | | Swing | | |

Habberley and Blakebrook
| Party | Candidate | Votes | % | ±% |
|---|---|---|---|---|
| Conservative | Ken Prosser | 827 | 39.6 | +11.1 |
| Labour | Barry McFarland | 550 | 26.4 | −9.2 |
| Health Concern | Nigel Addison | 452 | 21.7 | −9.3 |
| Liberal Democrats | Vicky Dixon | 258 | 12.4 | +12.4 |
| Majority | | 277 | 13.2 | |
| Turnout | | 2,087 | 40.0 | +0.2 |
| Conservative gain from Labour | | Swing | | |

Lickhill
| Party | Candidate | Votes | % | ±% |
|---|---|---|---|---|
| Health Concern | Brian Glass | 924 | 49.6 | −5.5 |
| Conservative | David Little | 743 | 39.9 | +8.1 |
| Labour | Cedric Smith | 196 | 10.5 | −0.1 |
| Majority | | 181 | 9.7 | −13.6 |
| Turnout | | 1,863 | 34.0 | −1.5 |
| Health Concern hold | | Swing | | |

Mitton
| Party | Candidate | Votes | % | ±% |
|---|---|---|---|---|
| Conservative | John Holden | 916 | 46.2 | +4.0 |
| Health Concern | Jim Parish | 765 | 38.6 | −4.0 |
| Labour | Gary Watson | 227 | 11.5 | +0.9 |
| Liberal Democrats | Mike Dixon | 73 | 3.7 | −0.9 |
| Majority | | 151 | 7.6 | |
| Turnout | | 1,981 | 34.0 | −0.7 |
| Conservative hold | | Swing | | |

Offmore and Comberton
| Party | Candidate | Votes | % | ±% |
|---|---|---|---|---|
| Liberal | Frances Oborski | 1,027 | 51.9 | +7.6 |
| Conservative | Gillian Onslow | 545 | 27.5 | −6.3 |
| Health Concern | Gill Smith | 241 | 12.2 | −2.1 |
| Labour | Matthew Nicholls | 166 | 8.4 | +0.8 |
| Majority | | 482 | 24.4 | +13.9 |
| Turnout | | 1,979 | 37.0 | −0.8 |
| Liberal hold | | Swing | | |

Oldington and Foley Park
| Party | Candidate | Votes | % | ±% |
|---|---|---|---|---|
| Conservative | Nathan Desmond | 510 | 50.4 | +11.9 |
| Health Concern | Peter Young | 210 | 20.8 | −2.2 |
| Liberal Democrats | Samantha Walker | 152 | 15.0 | −6.8 |
| Labour | Paul Mills | 139 | 13.7 | −2.9 |
| Majority | | 300 | 29.6 | +14.1 |
| Turnout | | 1,011 | 27.9 | −3.2 |
| Conservative hold | | Swing | | |

Rock
| Party | Candidate | Votes | % | ±% |
|---|---|---|---|---|
| Conservative | Douglas Godwin | 606 | 62.3 | +16.0 |
| Independent | John Simmonds | 367 | 37.7 | −16.0 |
| Majority | | 239 | 24.6 | |
| Turnout | | 973 | 48.0 | +1.8 |
| Conservative gain from Independent | | Swing | | |

Sutton Park
| Party | Candidate | Votes | % | ±% |
|---|---|---|---|---|
| Conservative | Marcus Hart | 1,118 | 59.6 | +12.3 |
| Health Concern | John Griffiths | 414 | 22.1 | −4.5 |
| Labour | David Prain | 175 | 9.3 | −1.5 |
| Liberal Democrats | Adrian Beavis | 169 | 9.0 | −6.3 |
| Majority | | 704 | 37.5 | +16.8 |
| Turnout | | 1,876 | 34.0 | −1.2 |
| Conservative hold | | Swing | | |

Wribbenhall
| Party | Candidate | Votes | % | ±% |
|---|---|---|---|---|
| Conservative | Arthur Buckley | 721 | 47.5 | −4.2 |
| Health Concern | Liz Davies | 452 | 29.8 | +0.8 |
| Labour | Paul Gittins | 289 | 19.0 | −0.3 |
| Liberal | Alexander Harvey | 57 | 3.8 | +3.8 |
| Majority | | 269 | 17.7 | −5.0 |
| Turnout | | 1,519 | 39.2 | +0.7 |
| Conservative hold | | Swing | | |

== By-elections between 2008 and 2010 ==
=== Lickhill ===
A by-election was held in Lickhill on 10 September 2009 after the death of Health Concern councillor Jill Fairbrother-Millis. The seat was held for Health Concern by Jim Parish with a majority of 131 votes over Conservative Chris Rogers.

Lickhill by-election 10 September 2009
| Party | Candidate | Votes | % | ±% |
|---|---|---|---|---|
| Health Concern | Jim Parish | 643 | 48.1 | −1.5 |
| Conservative | Chris Rogers | 512 | 38.3 | −1.6 |
| Labour | Jenny Knowles | 140 | 10.5 | 0.0 |
| Liberal Democrats | Clare Cassidy | 41 | 3.1 | +3.1 |
| Majority | | 131 | 9.8 | +0.1 |
| Turnout | | 1,336 | 24.4 | −9.6 |
| Health Concern hold | | Swing | | |

=== Areley Kings ===
A by-election was held in Areley Kings on 10 December 2009 after the death of Conservative councillor Mike Partridge. The seat was gained for Labour by James Shaw with a majority of 123 votes over Health Concern candidate Gary Talbot.

Areley Kings by-election 10 December 2009
| Party | Candidate | Votes | % | ±% |
|---|---|---|---|---|
| Labour | James Shaw | 544 | 38.3 | +5.5 |
| Health Concern | Gary Talbot | 421 | 29.6 | +0.4 |
| Conservative | Kenneth Henderson | 394 | 27.7 | −7.5 |
| UKIP | Anthony Baker | 63 | 4.4 | +4.4 |
| Majority | | 123 | 8.7 | |
| Turnout | | 1,422 | 31.0 | −9.9 |
| Labour gain from Conservative | | Swing | | |
