= 2016 Wyre Forest District Council election =

2016 UK local government election

Results of the 2016 Wyre Forest District Council election

The 2016 Wyre Forest District Council election took place on 5 May 2016 to elect members of Wyre Forest District Council in Worcestershire, England. This was on the same day as other local elections.

== Ward results ==
=== Aggborough & Spennells ===
Aggborough & Spennells 2016
Party	Candidate	Votes	%	±%
Independent	John Cedric Aston	922	41.3	
Conservative	Anna Coleman	389	17.4	
UKIP	Philip Howard Jeanes	309	13.8	
Health Concern	Keith Roderick Robertson	306	13.7	
Labour	Brian Alan Rushbrook	245	11.0	
Green	Doug Hine	63	2.8	
Majority		533	23.9	
Independent hold		Swing		

=== Areley Kings & Riverside ===
Areley Kings & Riverside 2016
Party	Candidate	Votes	%	±%
Labour	Vi Higgs	659	33.2	
Conservative	Lin Henderson	566	28.6	
Health Concern	John William Roland Thomas	367	18.5	
UKIP	Berenice Susan Dawes	344	17.4	
Green	Nick Atkinson	46	2.3	
Majority		93	4.7	
Labour gain from Conservative		Swing		

=== Bewdley & Rock ===
Bewdley & Rock 2016
Party	Candidate	Votes	%	±%
Conservative	Rod Wilson	851	34.5	
Health Concern	Calne Elaine Edginton-White	555	22.5	
UKIP	Maurice Andrew Alton	479	19.4	
Labour	Rod Stanczyszyn	478	19.4	
Green	Phil Oliver	107	4.3	
Majority		296	12.0	
Conservative hold		Swing		

=== Blakebrook & Habberley South ===
Blakebrook & Habberley South 2016
Party	Candidate	Votes	%	±%
Conservative	Juliet Denise Smith	633	34.4	
UKIP	George Connolly	452	24.6	
Labour	Bernadette Connor	414	22.5	
Liberal Democrats	Adrian Stanley Beavis	170	9.2	
Green	Victoria Ann Lea	169	9.2	
Majority		181	9.8	
Conservative hold		Swing		

=== Broadwaters ===
Broadwaters 2016
Party	Candidate	Votes	%	±%
Labour	Steven John Walker	485	26.3	
UKIP	Paul Wooldridge	432	23.4	
Health Concern	Peter Winston Montgomery Young	394	21.3	
Conservative	William Paul Stephen	337	18.3	
Green	Dave Finch	115	6.2	
Liberal Democrats	Rachel Louise Akathiotis	83	4.5	
Majority		53	2.9	
Labour gain from UKIP		Swing		

=== Foley Park & Hoobrook ===
Foley Park & Hoobrook 2016
Party	Candidate	Votes	%	±%
Conservative	Nicky Gale	611	31.3	
UKIP	Michael James William Wrench	497	25.5	
Labour	Gerald Crumpton	425	21.8	
Health Concern	John Frederick Byng	318	16.3	
Liberal Democrats	Leia Rachel Devon Beavis	100	5.1	
Majority		114	5.8	
Conservative hold		Swing		

=== Franche & Habberley North ===
Franche & Habberley North 2016
Party	Candidate	Votes	%	±%
Labour	Nigel Knowles	867	35.5	
Conservative	Paul Bernard Harrison	695	28.4	
Health Concern	Caroline Marie Shellie	436	17.8	
UKIP	Bill Hopkins	385	15.7	
Green	John Edward Davis	62	2.5	
Majority		172	7.0	
Labour hold		Swing		

=== Mitton ===
Mitton 2016
Party	Candidate	Votes	%	±%
Health Concern	Nicola Martin	580	29.9	
UKIP	John Holden	502	25.8	
Conservative	Tony Muir	432	22.2	
Labour	Jill Hawes	394	20.3	
Green	Gilda Maria Davis	34	1.8	
Majority		78	4.0	
Health Concern gain from Conservative		Swing		

=== Offmore & Comberton ===
Offmore & Comberton 2016
Party	Candidate	Votes	%	±%
Liberal Democrats	Shazu Miah	610	25.8	
UKIP	Martin John Stooke	549	23.2	
Conservative	Mike Cheeseman	412	17.4	
Labour	Nick Savage	384	16.2	
Health Concern	Meriel Rose Acton	326	13.8	
Green	Brett Caulfield	86	3.6	
Majority		61	2.6	
Liberal Democrats gain from Health Concern		Swing		

=== Wribbenhall & Arley ===
Wribbenhall & Arley 2016
Party	Candidate	Votes	%	±%
Conservative	Rebecca Jane Vale	471	32.2	
Health Concern	Linda Anne Candlin	429	29.3	
Labour	Daniel John Crampton	311	21.2	
UKIP	David John Field	222	15.2	
Green	Martin Layton	31	2.1	
Majority		42	2.9	
Conservative hold		Swing		

=== Wyre Forest Rural ===
Wyre Forest Rural 2016
Party	Candidate	Votes	%	±%
Conservative	Stephen John Williams	1,273	51.6	
Labour	David Paul Jones	725	29.4	
UKIP	Dan Collins	468	19.0	
Majority		548	22.2	
Conservative hold		Swing		

== By-elections between 2016 and 2018 ==
Mitton by-election 4 May 2017
Party	Candidate	Votes	%	±%
Conservative	Howard Williams	797	38.6	+16.4
Health Concern	John Thomas	506	24.5	−5.4
Labour	Cliff Brewer	429	20.8	+0.5
UKIP	John Holden	215	10.4	−15.4
Liberal Democrats	Simon Ford	79	3.8	+3.8
Green	Vicky Lea	39	1.9	+0.1
Majority		291	14.1	
Turnout		2,065		
Conservative hold		Swing		
