= 2015 Wyre Forest District Council election =

2015 UK local government election

Map of the results of the 2015 Wyre Forest District Council election. Conservatives in blue, Labour in red, independents in light grey, Health Concern in pink, UK Independence Party in purple, Liberal in orange and vacant in white.

The 2015 Wyre Forest District Council election took place on 7 May 2015 to elect members of Wyre Forest District Council in Worcestershire, England. The whole council was up for election after boundary changes reduced the number of seats by nine. The Conservative Party gained overall control of the council from no overall control.

== Background ==
After the last election in 2014 no party had a majority on Wyre Forest District Council. The Conservatives were the largest party with 15 councillors, while Labour had 9, Health Concern 7, the UK Independence Party 5, independents 4 and there were 2 Liberals. Following the election the Conservatives formed an alliance with the 4 independents and 2 Liberals to run the council with exactly half of the seats.

In June 2014 Mike Price defected from the Liberal Party to the Conservatives, meaning that Fran Oborski was left as the only Liberal councillor. By the time of the 2015 election the Conservative group had increased to 17 councillors, as independent Julian Phillips joined the party.

The whole of Wyre Forest District Council was elected in 2015 after boundary changes reduced the number of wards from 17 to 12 and the number of councillors from 42 to 33. These changes meant ten wards elected three councillors each, while one ward elected two councillors and one ward elected a single councillor. However the election in the Areley Kings and Riverside ward was delayed until June 2015 after the death of one of the candidates.

Four councillors stood down and did not seek re-election in 2015, Douglas Godwin, Pauline Hayward, Lynn Hyde and Mike Kelly.

== Election result ==
The Conservatives gained a majority on the council after winning 21 of the 30 seats contested on 7 May. Both Labour and Health Concern were reduced to two seats on the council, while the UK Independence Party only won one seat. Among those to lose seats were the leader of the UK Independence Party on the council, Michael Wrench, and the Health Concern mayor of Stourport, Cliff Brewer. Independents won all three seats in Aggborough and Spennells, while Fran Oborski was re-elected as the only Liberal councillor.

Opposition candidates were concerned that the reduction in the number of polling stations after the boundary changes had resulted in long queues to vote.

After the delayed election in Areley Kings and Riverside resulted in two Conservatives and one Labour councillors being elected, the Conservatives had 23 seats and Labour had 3 seats.

Wyre Forest local election result 2015
Party	Seats	Gains	Losses	Net gain/loss	Seats %	Votes %	Votes	+/−
Conservative	23			+6	69.7	38.1	42,669	+11.9%
Labour	3			-6	9.1	15.8	17,693	-2.2%
Independent	3			0	9.1	3.9	4,421	+0.6%
Health Concern	2			-5	6.1	13.6	15,261	-7.2%
UKIP	1			-4	3.0	20.7	23,180	-5.1%
Liberal	1			0	3.0	2.4	2,651	-1.8%
Green	0			0	0	4.5	4,992	+3.1%
Liberal Democrats	0			0	0	0.6	642	+0.6%
TUSC	0			0	0	0.4	469	+0.1%
Patriotic Socialist Party	0			0	0	0.0	34	+0.0%

The above results include the delayed election in Areley Kings and Riverside.

== Ward results ==
Aggborough and Spennells (3 seats)
Party	Candidate	Votes	%	±%
Independent	Helen Dyke	1,706		
Independent	Peter Dyke	1,441		
Independent	John Aston	1,274		
Conservative	Tracey Onslow-Fage	1,239		
Conservative	Ian Siddall	1,046		
Conservative	Andrew Tromans	993		
Labour	Brian Rushbrook	704		
UKIP	Graham Gardner	653		
Health Concern	Keith Robertson	617		
UKIP	Mark Humphries	591		
UKIP	Philip Jeanes	505		
Green	Douglas Hine	410		
Turnout		11,179	65.1	

Bewdley and Rock (3 seats)
Party	Candidate	Votes	%	±%
Conservative	John-Paul Campion	2,194		
Conservative	Stephen Clee	1,953		
Conservative	Jennifer Greener	1,874		
Health Concern	Calne Edginton-White	1,080		
Health Concern	John Beeson	959		
Labour	Mark Flello	904		
UKIP	Maurice Alton	875		
Health Concern	Philip Edmundson	837		
UKIP	Christopher Wood	757		
Labour	Rodney Stanczyszyn	730		
UKIP	Gary Talbot	627		
Green	Phillip Oliver	566		
Turnout		13,356	73.7	

Blakebrook and Habberley South (3 seats)
Party	Candidate	Votes	%	±%
Conservative	John Hart	1,232		
Conservative	Ruth Gregory	1,194		
Conservative	Juliet Smith	1,070		
UKIP	David Hollyoak	871		
UKIP	Philip Daniels	833		
Labour	Bernadette Connor	792		
Labour	Paul Connor	790		
UKIP	Caroline Moran	699		
Health Concern	Julie Bennett	669		
Labour	Leroy Wright	612		
Green	Natalie McVey	481		
Green	Victoria Lea	289		
Liberal Democrats	Michael Troth	211		
Green	Martin Layton	206		
TUSC	Kevin Young	68		
Turnout		10,017	55.8	

Broadwaters (3 seats)
Party	Candidate	Votes	%	±%
Health Concern	Mary Rayner	931		
Conservative	John Desmond	923		
UKIP	Steven Harrington	748		
Labour	Mumshad Ahmed	745		
Labour	Steven Walker	722		
Labour	Adrian Sewell	717		
Conservative	Gillian Onslow	689		
Health Concern	Peter Young	655		
UKIP	William Hopkins	637		
UKIP	Paul Wooldridge	602		
Conservative	Greta Smith	561		
Green	David Finch	358		
Liberal	Esther Smart	192		
Patriotic Socialist Party	Brian Ryder	34		
Turnout		8,514	53.0	

Foley Park and Hoobrook (3 seats)
Party	Candidate	Votes	%	±%
Conservative	Nathan Desmond	1,348		
Conservative	Sally Chambers	1,297		
Labour	Samuel Arnold	1,046		
Conservative	Nichola Gale	1,036		
UKIP	Michael Wrench	901		
UKIP	Sophie Edginton	891		
UKIP	Charlotte Stokes	792		
Health Concern	Louise Hinett	770		
Liberal Democrats	Clare Cassidy	431		
Green	Ronald Lee	392		
Turnout		8,904	55.0	

Frances and Habberley North (3 seats)
Party	Candidate	Votes	%	±%
Conservative	Jeffrey Baker	2,006		
Conservative	Anne Hingley	1,930		
Labour	Nigel Knowles	1,443		
Conservative	Daniel McCann	1,347		
Health Concern	Caroline Shellie	1,137		
Labour	Barry McFarland	1,113		
UKIP	Anthony Clent	1,039		
UKIP	David White	809		
UKIP	Peter Willoughby	742		
Green	Jonathan Mills	437		
TUSC	Nigel Gilbert	155		
TUSC	Ingra Kirkland	112		
Turnout		12,270	64.3	

Lickhill
Party	Candidate	Votes	%	±%
Conservative	David Little	581	38.2	
Health Concern	Brian Glass	336	22.1	
UKIP	Adrian Dawes	285	18.7	
Labour	Carol Warren	259	17.0	
Green	Nicholas Atkinson	61	4.0	
Majority		245	16.1	
Turnout		1,522	68.9	

Mitton (3 seats)
Party	Candidate	Votes	%	±%
Conservative	Sara Fearn	1,517		
Conservative	Christopher Rogers	1,273		
Conservative	Tony Muir	1,170		
Health Concern	Clifford Brewer	1,122		
Health Concern	James Parish	1,118		
UKIP	John Holden	1,022		
Health Concern	Michael Salter	987		
UKIP	Berenice Dawes	952		
UKIP	Wayne Sheldon	840		
Labour	Jillian Hawes	823		
Labour	George Jones	675		
Green	Gilda Davis	350		
Turnout		11,849	61.6	

Offmore and Comberton (3 seats)
Party	Candidate	Votes	%	±%
Liberal	Frances Oborski	1,353		
Conservative	Rosemary Bishop	1,274		
Health Concern	Graham Ballinger	985		
Conservative	Paul Harrison	953		
UKIP	Martin Stooke	949		
Conservative	Michael Price	903		
Labour	Margaret Bradley	881		
UKIP	Kathleen Breese	842		
UKIP	Anthony Whitmore	685		
Labour	John Rocks	661		
Liberal	Rachel Akathiotis	558		
Liberal	Shazu Miah	548		
Green	Brett Caulfield	405		
TUSC	Lawrence Boyle	134		
Turnout		11,131	61.5	

Wribbenhall and Arley (2 seats)
Party	Candidate	Votes	%	±%
Conservative	Gordon Yarranton	1,195		
Conservative	Julian Phillips	1,078		
Labour	George Court	581		
Health Concern	Linda Candlin	545		
Health Concern	Elizabeth Davies	525		
UKIP	David Field	525		
Labour	Conan Norton	422		
UKIP	Melanie Mannion	394		
Green	Louise Ryan	215		
Turnout		5,480	69.7	

Wyre Forest Rural (3 seats)
Party	Candidate	Votes	%	±%
Conservative	Marcus Hart	2,517		
Conservative	Ian Hardiman	2,417		
Conservative	Stephen Williams	2,141		
Labour	Christopher Nicholls	1,347		
UKIP	Dan Collins	898		
Health Concern	Derek Killingworth	880		
UKIP	Sarah Hopkins	874		
Green	Katherine Spohrer	756		
UKIP	Craig Leonard	724		
Turnout		12,554	74.4	

=== Areley Kings and Riverside delayed election ===
The election in Areley Kings and Riverside ward took place on 9 June 2015, delayed from 7 May when the rest of the council voted. This came after the death of a Health Concern candidate for the ward and former councillor for Areley Kings, Nigel Thomas, on 12 April.

Conservatives Ken and Lin Henderson won two of the three seats, while the Labour group leader Jamie Shaw was also elected. There was a recount after Lin Henderson took the third seat, three votes ahead of Labour's Vi Higgs. Meanwhile, the failure of Health Concern to win seats in the ward meant that they had no councillors for Stourport for the first time in over a decade.

Areley Kings and Riverside (3 seats)
Party	Candidate	Votes	%	±%
Conservative	Ken Henderson	662		
Labour	Jamie Shaw	633		
Conservative	Lin Henderson	564		
Labour	Vi Higgs	561		
Labour	Rob Lloyd	532		
Conservative	Malcolm Gough	492		
Health Concern	John Thomas	404		
Health Concern	Cliff Brewer	378		
Health Concern	Dixon Sheppard	326		
UKIP	Martin Clapton	213		
UKIP	Ian Jones	209		
UKIP	Trevor Newman	196		
Green	John Davis	66		
Turnout		5,236	27.0	

== By-elections between 2015 and 2016 ==
A by-election took place in Blakebrook and Habberley South on 24 September 2015 after the resignation of Conservative councillor Ruth Gregory due to ill health.

Blakebrook and Habberley South by-election 24 September 2015
Party	Candidate	Votes	%	±%
Conservative	Tracey Onslow	595	40.0	+11.5
UKIP	Michael Wrench	252	16.9	−3.2
Labour	Bernadette Connor	247	16.6	−1.7
Green	Natalie McVey	173	11.6	+0.5
Health Concern	Jim Lawson	167	11.2	−4.3
Liberal Democrats	Adrian Beavis	54	3.6	−1.3
Majority		343	25.1	
Turnout		1,488		
Conservative hold		Swing		
