= Municipal Borough of Kidderminster =

Former local government area in the UK

Coordinates: 52.388°N 2.2490°W

Kidderminster
- Population
  - 1911: 24,333
  - 1931: 28,917
  - 1961: 41,671
- History
  - Origin: Ancient borough
  - Created: 1835
  - Abolished: 1974
  - Succeeded by: Wyre Forest District
- Status: Municipal borough
- Government
  - HQ: Kidderminster
  - Motto: DEO JUVANTE ARTE ET INDUSTRIA FLORET' (Latin) "With God's help, it flourishes by art and industry"
- Arms of Kidderminster Borough Council

The Municipal Borough of Kidderminster was a local government district in Worcestershire, that existed from 1835 to 1974. It was abolished in 1974 under the Local Government Act 1972, to form part of the Wyre Forest District.
