= 2018 Wyre Forest District Council election =

2018 UK local government election

Results of the 2018 Wyre Forest District Council election

The 2018 Wyre Forest District Council election took place on 3 May 2018 to elect members of the Wyre Forest District Council in Worcestershire, England. They were held on the same day as other local elections.

== Council Composition ==
=== After the election ===
| 21 | 4 | 3 | 3 | 2 |
| Conservatives | Labour | Liberal Democrats | Independent | Independent Community and Health Concern |

== Ward results ==
=== Aggborough & Spennells ===
Aggborough & Spennells 2018
| Party | Candidate | Votes | % | ±% |
|---|---|---|---|---|
| Independent | Peter Dyke | 1,151 | 49.0 | |
| Conservative | Ian John Siddall | 580 | 24.7 | |
| Labour | Ben James Davies | 443 | 18.9 | |
| Health Concern | Keith Roderick Robertson | 174 | 7.4 | |
| Turnout | | 2,348 | 36.09 | |

Peter Dyke was elected.

=== Areley Kings & Riverside ===
Areley Kings & Riverside 2018
| Party | Candidate | Votes | % | ±% |
|---|---|---|---|---|
| Labour | James Alexander Shaw | 838 | 42.2 | |
| Conservative | Lin Henderson | 818 | 41.2 | |
| Health Concern | Gemma Helen Taylor-Robinson | 270 | 13.6 | |
| Liberal Democrats | Christopher Pratt | 58 | 2.9 | |
| Turnout | | 1991 | 30.98 | |

James Alexander Shaw was elected but resigned in November 2018 citing ill-health.

=== Bewdley & Rock ===
Bewdley & Rock 2018
| Party | Candidate | Votes | % | ±% |
|---|---|---|---|---|
| Conservative | Nick Harris | 1,179 | 45.6 | |
| Labour | Rod Stanczuszyn | 651 | 25.2 | |
| Health Concern | Calne Elaine Edginton-White | 551 | 21.3 | |
| Liberal Democrats | Heidi Ruth Worth | 101 | 3.9 | |
| Green | Phil Oliver | 101 | 3.9 | |
| Turnout | | 2594 | 37.34 | |

Nick Harris was elected and became the youngest Councillor in the UK.

=== Blakebrook & Habberley South ===
Blakebrook & Habberly South 2018
| Party | Candidate | Votes | % | ±% |
|---|---|---|---|---|
| Conservative | Tracey Onslow | 910 | 53.6 | |
| Labour | Daniel John Crampton | 470 | 27.7 | |
| Green | Victoria Ann Caulfield | 177 | 10.4 | |
| Liberal Democrats | Clare Ramona Cassidy | 141 | 8.3 | |
| Turnout | | 1703 | 25.42 | |

Tracey Onslow was elected.

=== Broadwaters ===
Broadwaters 2018
| Party | Candidate | Votes | % | ±% |
|---|---|---|---|---|
| Labour | Gareth David Webster | 475 | 27.5 | |
| Conservative | John Reginald Desmond | 465 | 26.9 | |
| Liberal Democrats | Abdur Razzak | 356 | 20.6 | |
| Health Concern | Peter Winston Montgomery | 256 | 14.8 | |
| Green | Anita Ostrowski | 90 | 5.2 | |
| UKIP | Bill Hopkins | 87 | 5.0 | |
| Turnout | | 1733 | 26.12 | |

=== Foley Park & Hoobrook ===
Foley Park & Hoobrook 2018
| Party | Candidate | Votes | % | ±% |
|---|---|---|---|---|
| Conservative | Sally Jane Chambers | 796 | 41.2 | |
| Labour | Brian Ronald Seymour-Smith | 457 | 23.7 | |
| Health Concern | Susan Caroline Meekings | 287 | 14.9 | |
| Liberal Democrats | Adrian Stanley Beavis | 230 | 11.9 | |
| UKIP | Craig Ashley Leonard | 90 | 4.7 | |
| Green | David John Finch | 71 | 3.7 | |
| Turnout | | 1936 | 26.27 | |

=== Franche & Habberley North ===
Franche & Habberly North 2018
| Party | Candidate | Votes | % | ±% |
|---|---|---|---|---|
| Conservative | Michael William Cheeseman | 993 | 41.9 | |
| Labour | Christopher David Nicholls | 696 | 29.3 | |
| Health Concern | Susannah Louise Griffiths | 452 | 19.1 | |
| Liberal Democrats | Sadie Marie Furey | 110 | 4.6 | |
| UKIP | Heather Rosemary Lacy | 81 | 3.4 | |
| Green | John Edward Davis | 40 | 1.7 | |
| Turnout | | 2377 | 31.68 | |

=== Mitton ===
Mitton 2018
| Party | Candidate | Votes | % | ±% |
|---|---|---|---|---|
| Conservative | Christopher John Rogers | 815 | 43.5 | |
| Labour | Clifford John Brewer | 529 | 28.2 | |
| Health Concern | John William Roland Thomas | 390 | 20.8 | |
| Liberal Democrats | Simon Ford | 81 | 4.3 | |
| Green | Douglas Peter Hine | 60 | 3.2 | |
| Turnout | | | | |

=== Offmore & Comberton ===
Offmore & Comberton 2018
| Party | Candidate | Votes | % | ±% |
|---|---|---|---|---|
| Liberal Democrats | Alan John Totty | 742 | 35.1 | |
| Conservative | Kevin George Gale | 505 | 23.9 | |
| Labour | Nicholas Savage | 391 | 18.5 | |
| Health Concern | Graham William Ballinger | 237 | 11.2 | |
| UKIP | Martin John Stooke | 160 | 7.6 | |
| Green | Brett Raymond Caulfield | 79 | 3.7 | |
| Turnout | | | | |

=== Wribbenhall & Arley ===
Wribbenhall & Arley 2018
| Party | Candidate | Votes | % | ±% |
|---|---|---|---|---|
| Conservative | Paul Harrison | 688 | 45.8 | |
| Labour | Philip John Edmundson | 394 | 26.2 | |
| Health Concern | John Frederick Byng | 299 | 19.9 | |
| Green | Megan Jane Williams | 87 | 5.8 | |
| Liberal Democrats | Leia Rachel Devon Beavis | 35 | 2.3 | |
| Turnout | | | | |

=== Wyre Forest Rural ===
Wyre Forest Rural 2018
| Party | Candidate | Votes | % | ±% |
|---|---|---|---|---|
| Conservative | Ian David Hardiman | 1,590 | 62.6 | |
| Labour | David Paul Jones | 668 | 26.3 | |
| Green | Katherine Elisabeth Spohrer | 182 | 7.2 | |
| Liberal Democrats | Rachel Louise Akathiotis | 98 | 3.9 | |
| Turnout | | | | |

== By-elections between 2018 and 2019 ==
Bewdley and Rock by-election 20 September 2018
| Party | Candidate | Votes | % | ±% |
|---|---|---|---|---|
| Conservative | Anna Coleman | 734 | 51.8 | +6.2 |
| Labour | Rod Stanczyszyn | 489 | 34.5 | +9.3 |
| Liberal Democrats | Clare Cassidy | 109 | 7.7 | +3.8 |
| Green | John Davis | 85 | 6.0 | +2.1 |
| Majority | | 245 | 17.3 | |
| Turnout | | 1,417 | | |
| Conservative hold | | Swing | | |
