= Wyre Forest District =

Coordinates: 52.389°N 2.255°W

Wyre Forest
- Non-metropolitan district
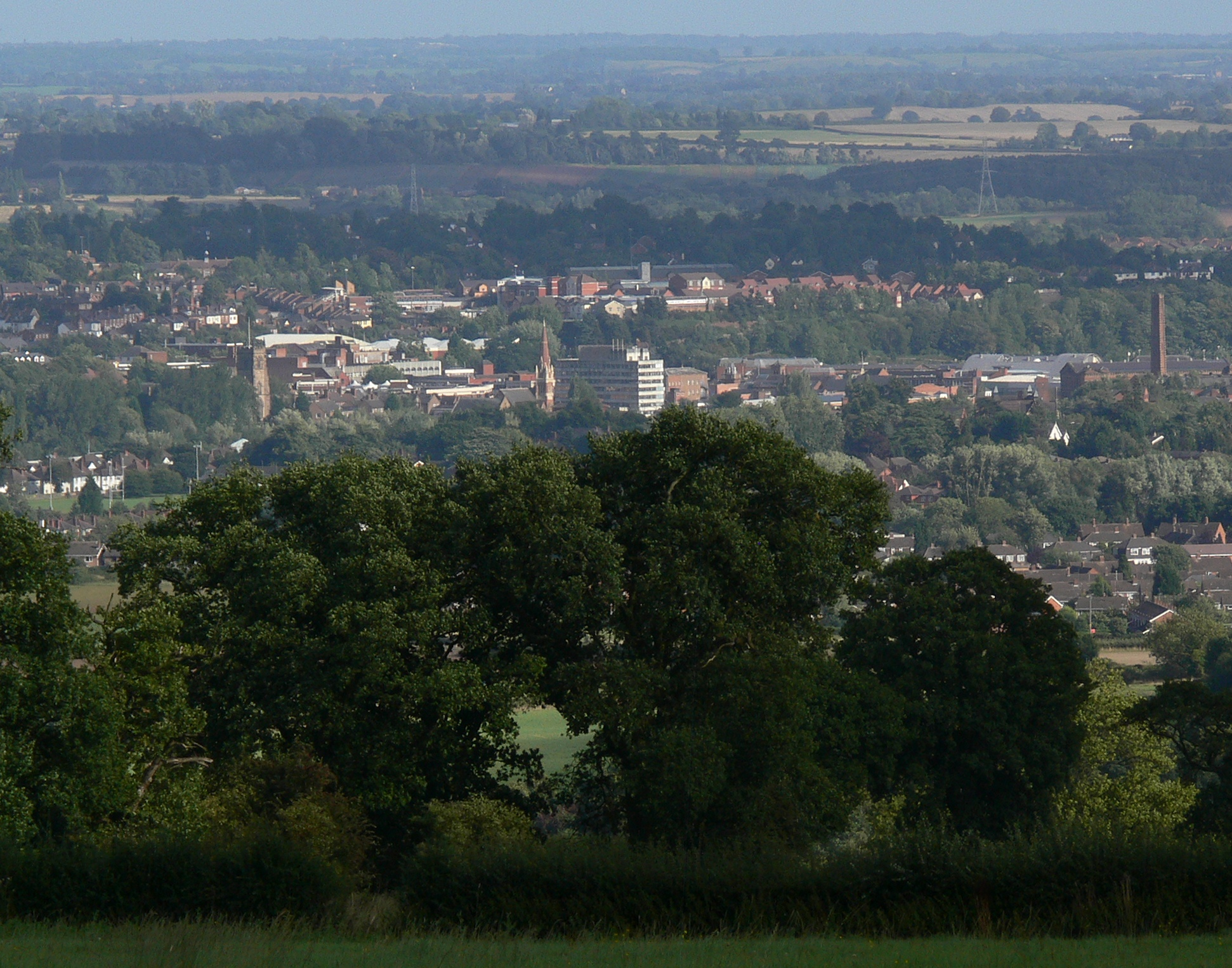
- Kidderminster, the district's largest town and administrative centre

- Wyre Forest shown within Worcestershire
- Sovereign state: United Kingdom
- Constituent country: England
- Region: West Midlands
- Non-metropolitan county: Worcestershire
- Status: Non-metropolitan district
- Admin HQ: Kidderminster
- Incorporated: 1 April 1974

Government
  - Type: Non-metropolitan district council
  - Body: Wyre Forest District Council
  - MP: Mark Garnier

Area
  - Total: 75.4 sq mi (195.4 km^{2})
  - Rank: 147th (of 296)

Population (2021 Census)
  - Total: 101,600
  - Rank: 240th (of 296)
  - Density: 1,347/sq mi (520.0/km^{2})

Ethnicity (2021)
  - Ethnic groups: List: 95.9% White; 1.9% Asian; 1.4% Mixed; 0.4% Black; 0.4% other

Religion (2021)
  - Religion: List: 53.3% Christianity; 38.6% no religion; 1% Islam; 0.1% Hinduism; 0.1% Judaism; 0.3% Sikhism; 0.2% Buddhism; 0.5% other; 5.9% not stated
- Time zone: UTC0 (GMT)
  - Summer (DST): UTC+1 (BST)
- ONS code: 47UG (ONS); E07000239 (GSS)
- OS grid reference: SO8264776847

Wyre Forest is a local government district in Worcestershire, England. It is named after the ancient woodland of Wyre Forest. The largest town is Kidderminster, where the council is based. The district also includes the towns of Stourport-on-Severn and Bewdley, along with several villages and surrounding rural areas.

The district borders Bromsgrove District to the east, Wychavon to the south-east, Malvern Hills District to the south-west, Shropshire to the north-west, and South Staffordshire to the north.

== History ==
The district was formed on 1 April 1974 under the Local Government Act 1972. The new district covered the area of four former districts, which were all abolished at the same time:

- Bewdley Municipal Borough
- Kidderminster Municipal Borough
- Kidderminster Rural District
- Stourport-on-Severn Urban District

The new district was named after the ancient woodland of Wyre Forest, much of which lies within the area.

Since 2011, Wyre Forest has formed part of the Greater Birmingham & Solihull Local Enterprise Partnership. Wyre Forest District Council made headlines in June 2024 when it announced that it had banned bouncy castles on council-owned land because of insurance problems.

== Abolition ==
Under current local government reorganisation plans, all district councils in Worcestershire, as well as the county council, will be abolished in 2028, with the district forming part of a new North Worcestershire unitary authority, also including the area of the Bromsgrove and Redditch districts.

== Governance ==
Wyre Forest District Council

Type
- Type: Non-metropolitan district

Leadership
- Chair: George Connolly, Conservative since 13 May 2026
- Leader: Marcus Hart, Conservative since 17 May 2023
- Chief Executive: Ian Miller since December 2009

Structure
- Seats: 33 Councillors
- Graph of the party split among 33 seats.
- Political groups: Administration (18) Conservative (18) Other parties (15) Labour (3) Liberal (2) Green (1) Reform (1) Independent (8)

Elections
- Last election: 4 May 2023
- Next election: 6 May 2027

Meeting place
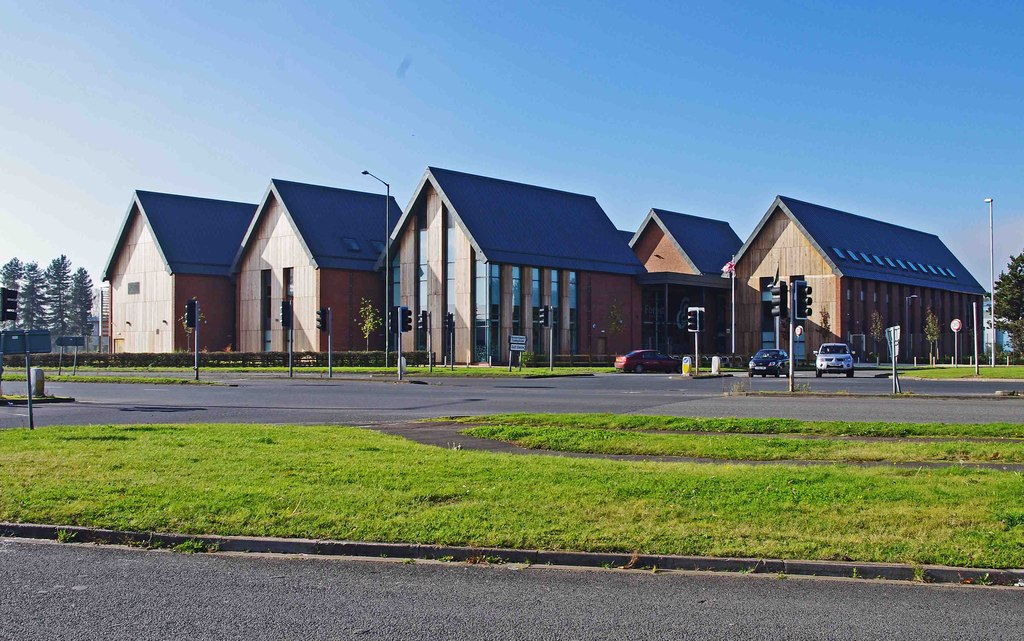
- Wyre Forest House, Finepoint Way, Kidderminster, DY11 7WF

Website
- www.wyreforestdc.gov.uk

Wyre Forest District Council provides district-level services. County-level services are provided by Worcestershire County Council. The whole district is also covered by civil parishes, which form a third tier of local government.

=== Political control ===
The council has been under Conservative majority control since the 2023 election.

The first elections to the council were held in 1973, initially operating as a shadow authority alongside the outgoing authorities until the new arrangements took effect on 1 April 1974. Political control of the council since 1974 has been as follows:

Party in control	Years
No overall control	1974–1976
Conservative	1976–1979
No overall control	1979–1996
Labour	1996–1999
No overall control	1999–2002
Health Concern	2002–2002
No overall control	2002–2008
Conservative	2008–2009
No overall control	2009–2010
Conservative	2010–2012
No overall control	2012–2015
Conservative	2015–2019
No overall control	2019–2023
Conservative	2023–present

=== Leadership ===
The leaders of the council since 1974 have been:

Councillor	Party	From	To
Graham Smith	Labour	1974	1975
Malcolm Cooper	Conservative	1975	1979
Anthony Batchelor	Liberal	1979	May 1983
Graham Ballinger	Conservative	1983	1984
Anthony Batchelor	Liberal	1984	1985
Mike Oborski	Liberal	1985	1986
Gilbert Edwards	Liberal	1986	1989
Jamie Shaw	Labour	1989	1994
Jane Bonnick	Liberal Democrats	1994	1996
Jamie Shaw	Labour	1996	1999
(no leader)		1999	2000
Mike Oborski	Liberal	2000	15 May 2002
Liz Davies	Health Concern	15 May 2002	14 May 2003
Howard Martin	Health Concern	14 May 2003	2004
Stephen Clee	Conservative	2004	May 2007
John Campion	Conservative	16 May 2007	Mar 2014
Marcus Hart	Conservative	2 Apr 2014	22 May 2019
Graham Ballinger	Health Concern	22 May 2019	12 May 2021
Helen Dyke	Independent	12 May 2021	May 2023
Marcus Hart	Conservative	17 May 2023	

=== Composition ===
Following the 2023 election, and subsequent changes of allegiance up to June 2026, the composition of the council is:

Party	Seats
Conservative	18
Labour	3
Liberal	2
Green	1
Reform	1
Independent	8
Total	33

The Green councillor sits in a group with seven of the eight independent councillors.

=== Premises ===
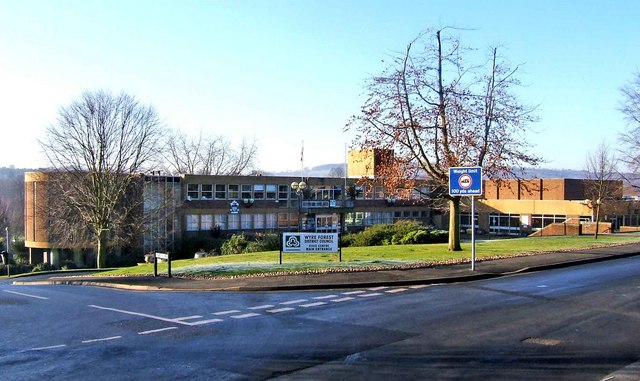
Stourport Civic Centre, New Street, Stourport-on-Severn: Council's headquarters until 2012.

The council is based at Wyre Forest House, which was purpose-built for the council and completed in 2012. The building is in the parish of Stourport-on-Severn, but lies on the outskirts of Kidderminster and has a Kidderminster postal address. Prior to 2012 the council was based at the Stourport Civic Centre on New Street, which had been completed in 1966 for the old Stourport-on-Severn Urban District Council.

== Elections ==
Since the last boundary changes in 2015 the council has comprised 33 councillors representing 12 wards, with each ward electing one, two or three councillors. Elections are held every four years.

=== Wards ===
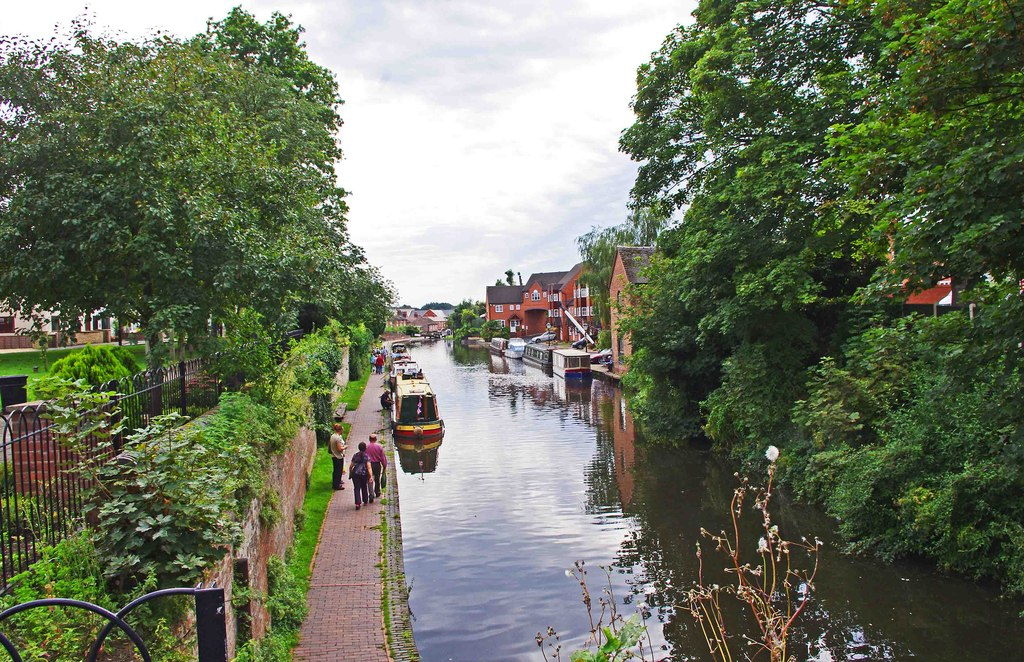
Stourport-on-Severn, the second-largest settlement in the district.

The wards are:

- Aggborough & Spennells
- Areley Kings & Riverside
- Bewdley & Rock
- Blakebrook & Habberley South
- Broadwaters
- Foley Park & Hoobrook
- Franche & Habberley North
- Lickhill
- Mitton
- Offmore & Comberton
- Wribbenhall & Arley
- Wyre Forest Rural

=== Wider politics ===
The Wyre Forest parliamentary constituency, which covers most of the district, is represented by the Conservative MP Mark Garnier. He has held the seat since the 2010 general election, when he gained it from Richard Taylor of Health Concern, who had held the seat from 2001 to 2010.

== Demography ==
In Wyre Forest, the population size has increased by 3.7%, from around 98,000 in 2011 to 101,600 in 2021.

== Parishes ==
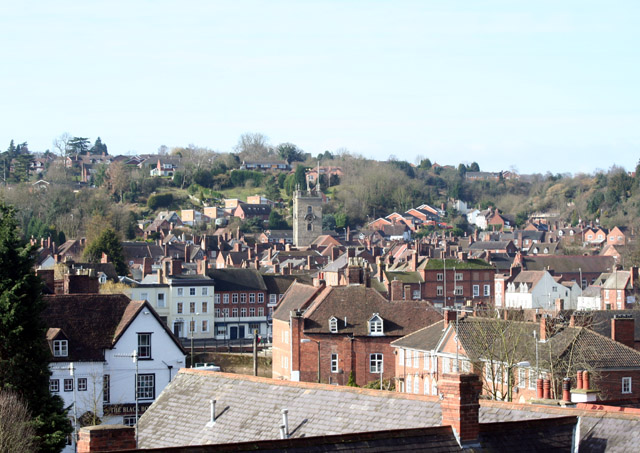
Bewdley, best known for the Severn Valley Railway and its historic Georgian buildings is the third-largest settlement in the district

The whole district is divided into civil parishes. The parish councils for Bewdley, Kidderminster and Stourport-on-Severn take the style "town council".

- Areley Kings
- Bewdley (town)
- Broome
- Chaddesley Corbett
- Churchill and Blakedown
- Kidderminster (town)
- Kidderminster Foreign
- Ribbesford
- Rock
- Rushock
- Stone
- Stourport-on-Severn (town)
- Upper Arley
- Wilden
- Wolverley and Cookley

== Schools ==
There are five secondary schools within the district.

- Baxter College
- The Bewdley School
- Wolverley C E Secondary School
- The Stourport High School & VIth Form Centre
- King Charles I School

== Media ==
=== Television ===
The area is served by the regional television programmes:

- BBC Midlands Today
- ITV News Central

=== Radio ===
Radio stations for the area are:

- BBC Hereford and Worcester
- Hits Radio Herefordshire & Worcestershire
- Greatest Hits Radio Herefordshire and Worcestershire
- Sunshine Radio
- Radio Wyvern

=== Newspapers ===
Local newspaper that served the area is The Shuttle.

== See also ==
- Wyre Forest District Council elections
