= Frederick Flowers =

Frederick Flowers (1810–1886) was a police magistrate.

== Family and education ==
Flowers, third son of the Rev. Field Flowers, rector of Partney, Lincolnshire, 1815–18, was born at Boston, Lincolnshire in 1810, and educated at Louth Grammar School, Lincolnshire, from 1815 to 1818. His brothers included George French Flowers, composer and musical theorist. He married in 1841 Ann, only daughter of R. Kirby, by whom he left one son.

== Career ==
He was admitted a student of Lincoln's Inn 10 November 1828, called to the bar 18 November 1839, joined the Midland circuit, and for many years practised as a special pleader.

In 1862 he was appointed recorder of Stamford, and was for some time revising barrister for the northern division of Nottinghamshire. He was named by Sir George Grey police magistrate at Bow Street, London, 6 July 1864, and sat at that court until his death. He also acted as a magistrate for Middlesex, Kent, Surrey, Hertfordshire, and Essex. As a police magistrate he was extremely well known and greatly respected. His common sense, combined with a sound knowledge of the law, prevented him from making many mistakes in his decisions. He possessed kindness, tact, and discrimination, and a strong sense of justice, especially towards those who were poor and weak.

He died at his residence, Holmesdale, Tottenham Lane, Hornsey, Middlesex, 26 January 1886, and was buried at Partney on 30 January, where on his grave is a monumental cross, and in the church there is a memorial brass.
