= Boston College (England) =

Location
- Skirbeck Road; Boston, Lincolnshire, PE21 6JF; England; 52.9733°N 0.0152°W

Information
- Type: Further education college
- Established: 1964
- Local authority: Lincolnshire
- Department for Education URN: 130761 Tables
- Ofsted: Reports
- Principal: Claire Foster
- Gender: Co-educational
- Age: 16+
- Website: http://www.boston.ac.uk

Boston College is a predominantly further education college in Boston in Lincolnshire, England. It is a Centre of Vocational Excellence (CoVE) for Early Years Care.

== History ==
In 1957 construction was planned to start in 1959-60, to cost £208,967. By 1960 it was to cost £249,650, with furniture to cost £70,000. In early April 1962 a contract for £255,368 was given to J.T. Barber & Sons of Boston.

It opened on Monday 14 September 1964, built by JT Barber & Sons of Boston.

It provided A-level courses for those not attending the town's two grammar schools.

It became an associate college of Leicester Polytechnic.

In 2007 a scheme for college redevelopment on West Street was abandoned through a lack of usable space. In 2008 the college planned for a £79m expansion of the college to replace the Skirbeck Road and Mill Road sites. A smaller redevelopment of the Skirbeck Road site was undertaken, funded by selling the building on Mill Road. The Mill Road building at the east of Boston was a former De Montfort University campus, and before that, Kitwood Boys School, now Haven High Academy. The adjacent Mill Road sports fields were not included in the sale.

=== Visits ===
- Prince Edward, Duke of Kent visited the De Montfort Campus on Thursday 7 December 2000

== Sites ==
The college is currently spread over five sites:

- Rochford Campus – engineering workshops, beauty therapy, swimming facilities and halls of residence for 200 students. Skirbeck Road, Boston, next to the Maud Foster Drain and the Geoff Moulder Leisure Complex.
- Sam Newsom Centre – music and performing arts facilities. South Street, Boston.
- Peter Paine Performance Centre – centre for sports and exercise science. Rosebery Avenue, Boston.
- Ingelow Centre – centre for students with Special Educational Needs. Rowley Road, Boston.
- Boston College Spalding – Red Lion Street, Spalding.

== Principals ==
- 1964 – 86 – Alan Moon
- 1986 – 2001 – David Pursell
- 2001 – 05 – David Pomfret
- 2005 – 11 – Sue Daley
- 2011 – 17 – Amanda Mosek
- 2017 – 2020 – Jo Maher
- 2020 – 2025 – Claire Foster

== Notable alumni ==
- Jason Atherton – chef
