= Fishtoft =

Village and suburb of Boston in Lincolnshire, England

Coordinates: 52.961666°N 0.025933°E

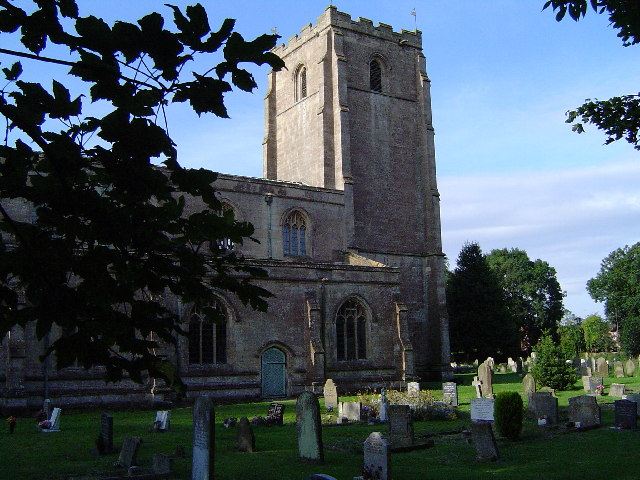
- St Guthlac's church, Fishtoft

- Location within Lincolnshire
- Population: 7,156 (2021)
- OS grid reference: TF361423
  - London: 100 mi (160 km) S
- District: Boston
- Shire county: Lincolnshire
- Region: East Midlands
- Country: England
- Sovereign state: United Kingdom
- Post town: BOSTON
- Postcode district: PE21
- Police: Lincolnshire
- Fire: Lincolnshire
- Ambulance: East Midlands
- UK Parliament: Boston and Skegness

Fishtoft is a village and suburb of Boston in Lincolnshire, England. Local government has been arranged in this way since the reorganization of 1 April 1974, which resulted from the Local Government Act 1972. This parish forms an electoral ward in itself. Hitherto, the parish had formed part of Boston Rural District, in the Parts of Holland. Holland was one of the three divisions (formally known as parts) of the traditional county of Lincolnshire. Since the Local Government Act 1888, Holland had been in most respects, a county in itself. The population of the civil parish at the 2011 census was 6,835. Rising significantly to 7,156 at the 2021 Census. Fishtoft is also a civil parish.

== History ==
The name of the village originates from the Old Norse word toft meaning a building site or a curtilage. Adding Fish in the 15th century may be a family name or indicate a connection with fishing. The place-name appears as Toft in the Domesday Book of 1086 and as Fishtoft in 1416.

The parish lies along the north-east side of The Haven and accommodates the Pilgrim Fathers Memorial at Scotia Creek. Fishtoft comprises three aspects – open countryside, the village of Fishtoft, and suburban overspill from Boston. The fields along Burton Croft Road are bounded by dykes which are home to water voles (an endangered species in the United Kingdom – Fishtoft is one of only 181 sites where voles can still be found). Fishtoft has a school, an Anglican church, a shop (at Hawthorn Tree Corner), and football and cricket clubs.

== Historic buildings ==
The parish church is dedicated to the Saxon saint St Guthlac. The stonework contains traces of Norman work. There is a reference to the church in the Domesday Book. The 18th-century Reading Room, a red brick building just off Rectory Close, is now a private house – it was for many decades used as a centre of learning and education.

The historic centre of the village was formerly an island in the tidal marshes – one of a series of islands around the coast of The Wash (each one marked by a medieval church). The parishes along the coast of the Wash had no eastern boundaries, and were continually expanding as new land was reclaimed from the tidal marshes. The marshes produced methane gas which spontaneously ignited to produce flares, giving rise to the belief that spirits haunted them and that the new land needed cleansing before it was safe to use. This may account for the veneration of St Guthlac at Fishtoft, the saint being renowned for driving out devils; a medieval statue of St Guthlac can be seen high up on the tower of the Fishtoft parish church, and formerly held the whip with which he cleansed the land of evil spirits.

The statue of St Guthlac set into the west tower is of considerable interest. Nikolaus Pevsner, in his volume on Lincolnshire (Buildings of England series) says that it is older than the fabric of the tower. It is possible that this is the original statue of the Guthlac cult, and would have been located inside the chancel.

As well as the parish church of St Guthlac there was a priory "cell" (or small religious house) on the site of what is now Stoke Priory house on the corner of Gaysfield Road; some remains of the priory cell could be seen in the garden of the house until recently. There was also a small medieval wayside chapel on the western side of Church Green Road, the site indicated by a significant elevation of ground just north of the bungalow opposite The Grange. In addition, the ground at the corner of Clampgate Road and Burton Croft Road, in what is now an open field, formerly held a substantial medieval building, possibly a manor house, called Panels (or Panals) which included a chapel.

The arrangement of religious buildings in medieval Fishtoft has given rise to speculation that the village may have been the centre of a cult of St Guthlac based on what is now the parish church, the monks of the priory cell helping to minister to the cult, and the wayside chapel in Church Green Road acting as a "slipper chapel" for pilgrims approaching the village along the permanent road from Boston. The feast of St Guthlac is held on 11 April.

== Modern times ==
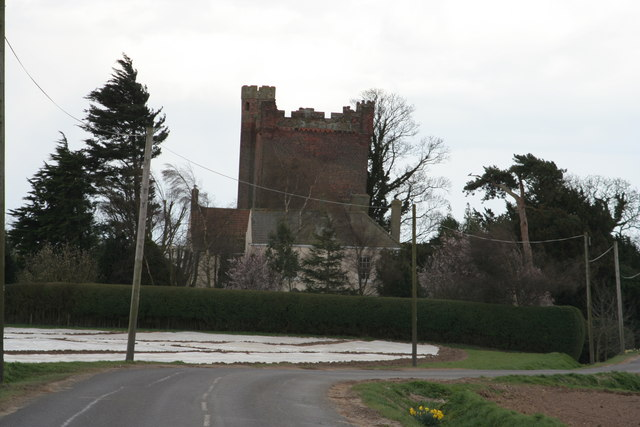
The Rochford Tower, circa 1460

Some evidence of a Roman settlement has been found in the area. There was also an important Anglo-Saxon settlement in the area, confirmed by an excavation on what is now Saxon Gardens. There was a separate hamlet in the parish called Fenne, dating back to the 13th century, in the area that later contained the Ball House Inn, Rochford Tower and Hawthorn Tree Corner. This area formed almost a separate community in the 1950s with its community hall. An important feature of the parish is the Hobhole Drain, constructed in the 19th century for land drainage purposes, which enters the River Witham near the Pilgrim Fathers Memorial. The water tower that formerly stood at the end of Cut End Road has recently been demolished – it was an exact copy of the water tower that still stands in Sutterton.

== Demographics ==
At the 2021 census, the ward profile population was 7,156. Of the findings, the ethnicity and religious composition of the ward was:

Fishtoft: Ethnicity: 2021 Census
Ethnic group	Population	%
White	6,668	93.2%
Asian or Asian British	269	3.8%
Mixed	98	1.4%
Black or Black British	66	0.9%
Other Ethnic Group	35	0.5%
Arab	19	0.2%
Total	7,156	100%

The religious composition of the ward at the 2021 Census was recorded as:

Fishtoft: Religion: 2021 Census
Religious	Population	%
Christian	4,476	66.8%
Irreligious	1,952	29.1%
Muslim	149	2.2%
Hindu	76	1.1%
Buddhist	19	0.3%
Other religion	16	0.2%
Jewish	7	0.1%
Sikh	2	0.1%
Total	7,156	100%

== Notable people ==
Alec Brader (MBE), professional footballer, schoolteacher and youth athletics coach lived at Fishtoft.
