= Pilgrim Fathers Memorial =

Coordinates: 52°56′31″N 0°01′25″E

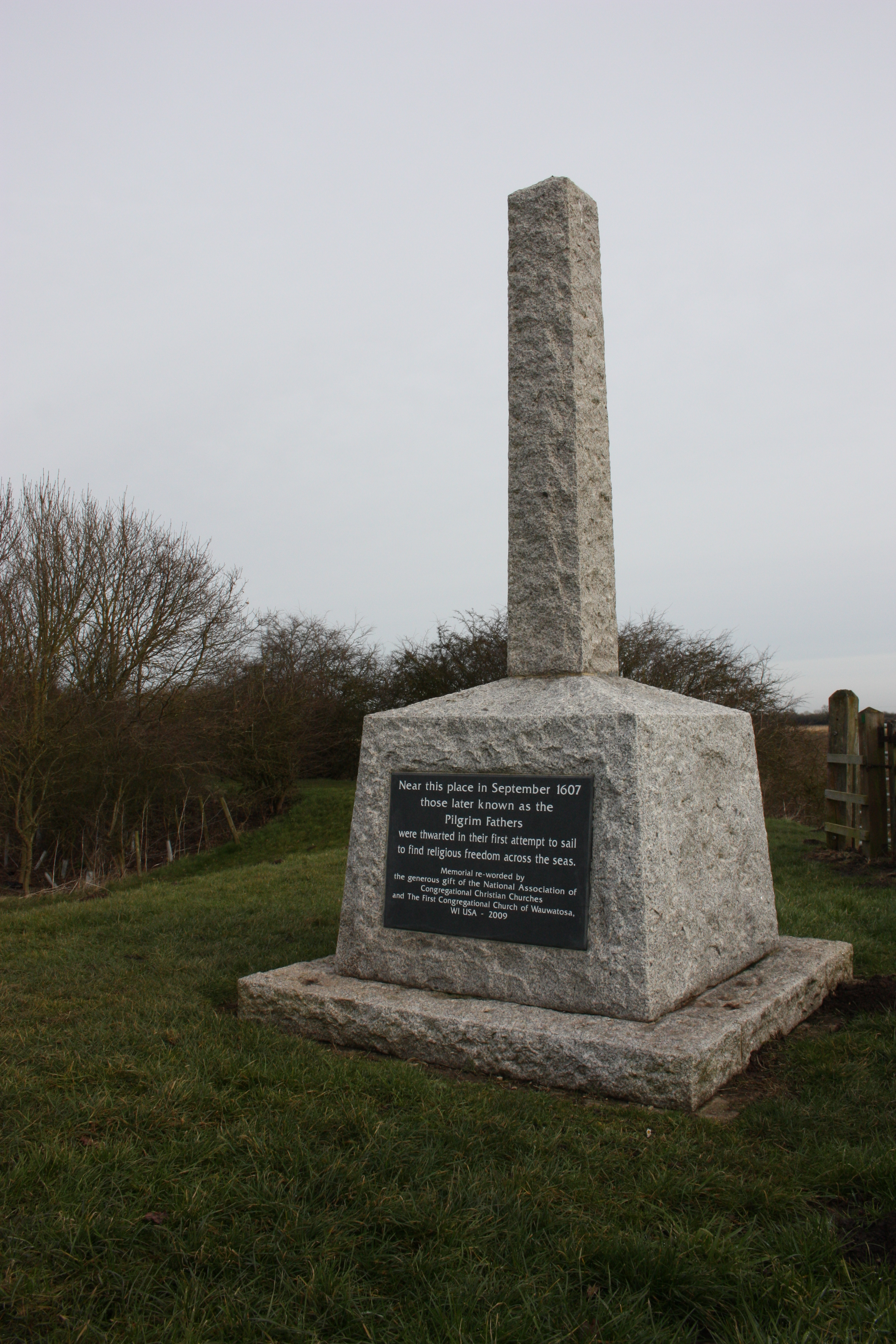
The memorial.

The Pilgrim Fathers Memorial is located on the north bank of The Haven at the site of the former Scotia Creek, Fishtoft, seaward of Boston in Lincolnshire, England, and consists of a small granite obelisk mounted on a granite block. It commemorates the attempt at finding religious freedom in September, 1607 by the Scrooby Congregation, a group of English Separatist Protestants who left for Holland. They were precursors of the Pilgrims who later crossed the Atlantic to New England.

== Connection to the Pilgrim Fathers ==
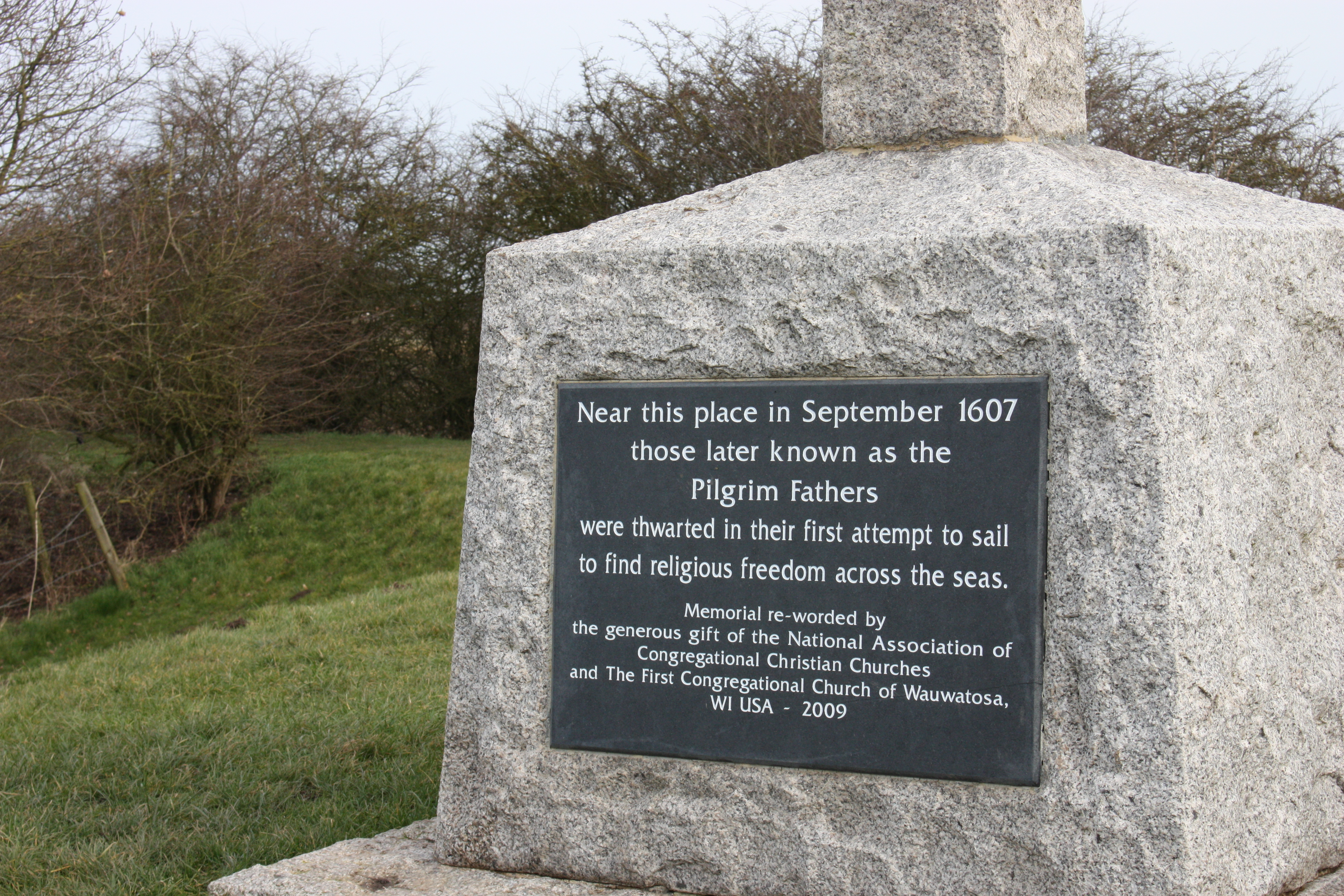
Close up of the inscription.

The men from Scrooby, Nottinghamshire, chartered a Dutch vessel to transport them to the Netherlands in 1607, but the attempt was thwarted when the captain betrayed them to the local authorities. They were arrested and taken by boat to attend a hearing by the magistrates in the Boston Guildhall, and they were imprisoned in the cells there for about a month.

In 1608, after their release, they made a second, this time successful, attempt from the Humber first arriving in Amsterdam. The Scrooby congregation moved to Leiden in 1609, before setting sail in 1620 for the New World via Southampton and Plymouth.

== The memorial ==
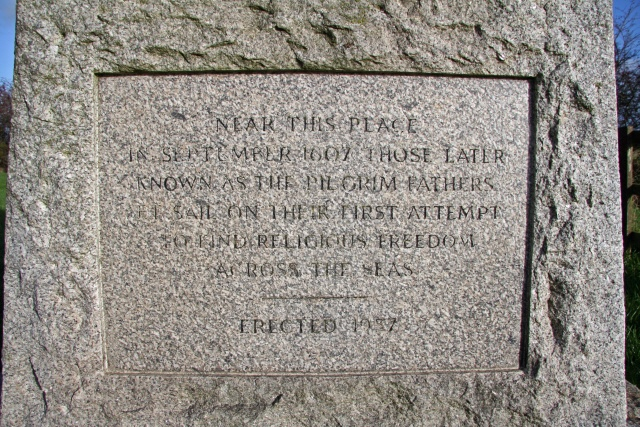
Inscription on the Pilgrim Fathers Memorial 1957-2009

The memorial was erected by the former Boston Borough Council in 1957, on the 350th anniversary of the event. The work was carried out by Leake's Masonry. The ceremony was attended by several members of the General Society of Mayflower Descendants, who made a donation towards the cost of the monument. Its design is a tapering shaft rising from a base-block, intended to symbolise the urge which drove a small band of men and women to leave their country and kinsfolk for conscience's sake. The material used typifies by its strength the power and stability of their faith.

The inscription on the front of the memorial used to read:

"Near this place in September 1607 those later known as "The Pilgrim Fathers" set sail on their first attempt to find religious freedom across the seas. Erected 1957"

It has since been updated to the following:

"Near this place in September 1607 those later known as the Pilgrim Fathers were thwarted in their first attempt to sail to find religious freedom across the seas.
Memorial re-worded by the generous gift of the National Association of Congregational Christian Churches and The First Congregational Church of Wauwatosa WI USA - 2009"

== See also ==
- Plymouth Colony
- Mayflower Compact
