= Carl Hudson =

British musician (born 1983)

Carl Hudson (born 22 October 1983 in Boston, Lincolnshire, England) is a British pianist and keyboardist who has performed with numerous acts including Leroy Hutson, Leon Ware, Professor Green, Emeli Sande, Beth Rowley, Jocelyn Brown, Tina Arena and Boy George / Culture Club

Since April 2015, Hudson has been playing keyboards for Boy George and Culture Club, Joining them on keyboards for three world tours.

Since 2010, he has also played keyboards for soul artists Omar Lye-Fook, Leon Ware, The Jones Girls and Jean Carne at venues around London and the UK.

Hudson works closely in the studio with producer SoulPersona, recording and playing alongside veteran Jamiroquai drummer Nick Van Gelder.

He released his first album, entitled Zoology For Martians in May 2013. It features musicians such as Nick Van Gelder (drums), Andy Tolman (bass), Terry Lewis (guitar), Bob Dowell (trombone), and Neil Waters (trumpet). Zoology For Martians is a concept album, depicting the evolution of life on earth using a jazz-funk soundtrack. It features the use of many analog synthesizers, such as the Prophet '08 and Oberheim Matrix 6. The album also features extensive liner notes written in a style similar to British TV naturalist Sir David Attenborough.

Hudson's second album, Pixel Planet was released in February 2016. Another concept album, the album depicts a visit by alien explorers to an Earth in the distant future, long after humans have since departed. The music is a mix of Funk, Hip-Hop and ambient Electronica, and features a large cast of London musicians, including Level 42's Pete Ray Biggin on drums. It was distributed on Splash Records, a UK based independent label specialising in Brit funk, and co-run by Jean-Paul 'Bluey' Maunick, who is also the leader of the band Incognito.
