= Dynamic Cassette International =

Dynamic Cassette International (DCI) is an internationally recognised Boston, Lincolnshire, UK based ink cartridge and laser toner manufacturing company, producing products under the Jet Tec brand name. DCI is the sole UK manufacturer of compatible ink cartridges. DCI is notable for winning the Queen's Award for Enterprise: Innovation in 2004 and the Queen's Award for Export and being one of the biggest employers in Boston, employing over 300 staff at its 40,000 square metres factory. The company is currently Europe's largest manufacturer of compatible inkjet cartridges and has a turnover in excess of £20 million.

On 31 December 2007, DCI / Jet Tec featured on the BBC Radio 4 consumer affairs programme “You and Yours”. The programme examined what is involved in the production of compatible and remanufactured inkjet cartridges and focused on consumers' concerns about the cost of printing

== History ==
DCI was founded by John Studholme and Helmut Michele in 1983. Originally the company had two production sites, the first one based in Boston, Lincolnshire, UK and the second one in Dortmund, Germany. The company started out by manufacturing cassette cartridges for typewriters and dot matrix printers.

Later Studholme and Michele split and formed two independent companies. Studholme continued under the name DCI and with the introduction of inkjet cartridges launched the Jettec brand. The company today is primarily known under this name.

Michele on the other hand continued under the name DCI Germany, which was then taken over by the French ARMOR group and renamed into Artech under which it still operates. Michele left the company in 2007 and is now retired.

== Jet Tec Products ==
DCI has the capacity to produce over 2 million compatible cartridges, 300,000 remanufactured cartridges and 250,000 refill kits per month, including:

- Epson compatible inkjet cartridges
- Canon compatible inkjet cartridges
- Brother compatible inkjet cartridges
- HP recycled inkjet cartridges
- Dell recycled inkjet cartridges
- Lexmark recycled inkjet cartridges
- Canon recycled inkjet cartridges
- Ink cartridge refill kits
- Epson Cartridge Chip Re-Setter for refill kits
- Jet Tec branded Inkjet paper
- HP Laser toner cartridges

== The Recycling Factory ==
DCI's The Recycling Factory is responsible for collecting empty HP, Dell, Lexmark and other cartridges for recycling.- Note there are thousands of other companies which collect these empty cartridges also.

== International ==
Jet Tec has international operations in Germany, with distribution agreements in Australia and most European countries.

== Queen's Award for Enterprise ==
DCI won the Queen's Award for Enterprise: Innovation in 2004 for developing a new technology which allows 30 per cent more ink to be put in a cartridge. This innovation has economic and environmental benefits as it lowers the amount of wasted ink in print cartridges.

== See also ==
- Queen's Award for Enterprise
- Boston, Lincolnshire
