= Boston Standard =

- Type: Weekly newspaper
- Owner: National World
- City: Boston, Lincolnshire
- Circulation: 828 (as of 2023)
- Website: lincolnshireworld.com

Boston Standard (previously Lincolnshire Standard) is a weekly newspaper based in the town of Boston, Lincolnshire, the Boston Target (another weekly newspaper owned by Local World) is its main rival.

As of 2012, it was owned by publishing group Johnston Press.

Boston Standard was founded as the Lincolnshire Standard in the 19th century. It has been the main newspaper for Boston, Lincolnshire.
