= Lincolnshire Standard =

The Lincolnshire Standard was a weekly newspaper published in Boston, England, attached to Lincolnshire Standard Ltd.

Founded in the 19th century, it is now published under the title Boston Standard. Its sister titles include the Sleaford Standard, Skegness Standard, Grantham Journal and Horncastle News.

The Lincolnshire Standard first ceased publication on 26 March 1958, when it merged with the Boston Guardian (which was established in 1854) to form the Lincolnshire Standard and Boston Guardian. However, the Lincolnshire Standard masthead was revived once more in 1962, and remained the name of the newspaper almost without interruption for the next 30 years before being published as the Boston Standard from 1992 onwards.
