= Joseph Farrow =

Nonconformist clergyman

Joseph Farrow (1652?–1692), was a nonconformist clergyman.

== Life ==
Farrow was born at Boston, Lincolnshire, of ‘religious parents,’ and educated at the grammar school of that town. He was afterwards entered at Magdalene College, Cambridge, as a member of which he proceeded M.A. On quitting the university he became private tutor in a family at Louth, Lincolnshire, for some years, during which time he refused the mastership of the newly erected free school at Brigg in the same county. He was episcopally ordained, and, after he had been successively chaplain to Lady Hussey of Caythorpe, Lincolnshire, and to Sir Richard Earle of Stragglethorpe, Lincolnshire, he returned to Boston and was curate there to Dr. Obadiah Howe until Howe's death in February 1683. He supplied Howe's place until the arrival of a new vicar.

From Boston he removed into the family of Sir William Ellys at Nocton, Lincolnshire, where he continued chaplain until his death. Among his friends he numbered Edward Fowler, afterwards bishop of Gloucester, John Locke, and Thomas Burnet, master of the Charterhouse. He died unmarried at Newark-upon-Trent, Nottinghamshire, on 22 July 1692, aged about forty, and was buried in the chancel of the church. As he was never beneficed, he escaped the penalty of his nonconformity. Benjamin Calamy, who observes that ‘he was not ejected in 1662,’ forgetting that Farrow could not then have been more than ten years old, gives him a wonderful character for learning, probity, and sanctity of life. He had, it seems, ‘a political head, and would give surprising conjectures about public affairs, by which he foretold the several steps of the glorious Revolution.’ Calamy mentions as his works ‘several sets of Sermons,’ which were ‘thought not much inferior to those of the most celebrated preachers of the age.’ He also left some ‘valuable manuscripts.’
