= Kitwood Boys School =

Coordinates: 52.9716°N 0.0078°W

Information
- School type: Secondary modern school
- Established: Early 1950s
- Closed: 1992
- Gender: Boys

Kitwood Boys School was a secondary modern school for boys in Boston, Lincolnshire, England, which began life in the early 1950s as part of the new Attlee Labour government's education programme (as did the nearby Kitwood Girls School). Initially the school provided an education to those not attaining higher Grammar School standards. Despite a brief period in the late 1970s and early 1980s which gave the school a bad name, the school was merged with the girls' school in September 1992 and lost many of its staff. The merged school is called Haven High and located on the site of the old girls' school. The boys' school became the De Montfort campus of Boston College.

The school took several annual trips, including camping to Leam Farm in Derbyshire, Brienz in Switzerland, and the Jorvik Viking Centre in York.
