= Hedley Adams Mobbs =

English architect (1891–1970)

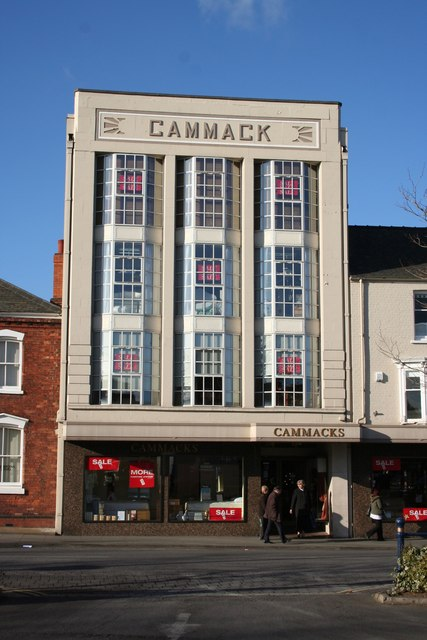
- Cammack's Wide Bargate, Boston. Art Deco frontage of 1931-31 by Mobbs
- Born: 7 January 1891
- Died: 10 October 1970 (aged 79); Sleaford
- Occupation: Architect

Hedley Adams Mobbs (1891-1970) was a British architect who worked in Boston, Lincolnshire.

Apart from his work as an architect he worked as cartoonist for the satirical magazine Punch. He was also a crack rifleman who took part in competitions at Bisley, played football (left wing) for Cambridge Town, a ragtime pianist, beekeeper, horticulturalist and artist. In later life he invented a device for dipping car headlights. He was also a philatelist writing standard works on the subject and advising on the formation of the Royal Stamp collection.

== Career ==
Hedley Mobbs was born at Oulton Broad, near Lowestoft. He was the younger brother of Sydney Mobbs. He was articled to John 'Concrete' Cockrill, the architect and surveyor in Great Yarmouth. In 1917 he married Lily Marsden.

He joined the nascent Royal Air Force at Cranwell towards the end of First World War. He moved to Boston in 1930, where his office was at 18a High Street. In 1939 he, along with Ralph Broadley and Herbert Butcher MP convened a committee in Boston (the Boston Guardians) to receive Czech Jewish Kindertransport children. In retirement in 1956 he moved to Sleaford where he took up bee-keeping and horticulture. He resigned as the official architect and a trustee of the Trustee Savings Bank. He died in Grantham Hospital 10 October 1971 and was buried in Quarrington churchyard.

== Works ==
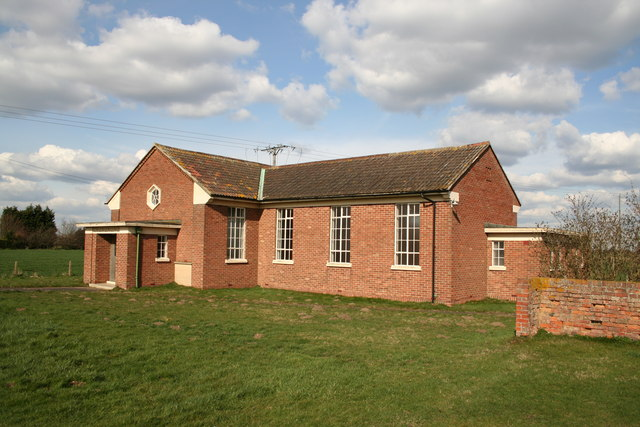
Sandy Bank Methodist Chapel when redundant in 2006

- Cammack's Furniture Store, 16a Wide Bargate, Boston. A building in the Art Deco style.
- Mason's (Clarks Shoes) Strait Bargate, Boston. Rebuilt shop.
- Zion Methodist Church, Brothertoft Road, Boston (1934). Chapel in a modernist style in red brick with bowed facade with tall windows.
- Boston Central Park (1932). Gates and adjacent pavilions
- Sandy Bank Methodist Chapel, near New York, Lincolnshire. Now converted into a house.

Also the re-building of The John Bull Tyre Co. factory at 77 Evington Valley Road, Leicester 1928. Private residences in Leicester (George Odom) and Woodhall Spa (George Robinson) but mainly in Boston, notably "Hemsby" Horncastle Road (ACP Dove).

== Literature ==
- Antonia Brodie (ed), Directory of British Architects, 1834–1914: 2 Vols, British Architectural Library, Royal Institute of British Architects, 2001, Vol 2, pg. 194.
- Minnis J., Carmichael K. & Fletcher C. (2015) Boston, Lincolnshire: Historic North Sea Port and Market Town, English Heritage, ISBN 9781848022706
