= Hussey Tower =

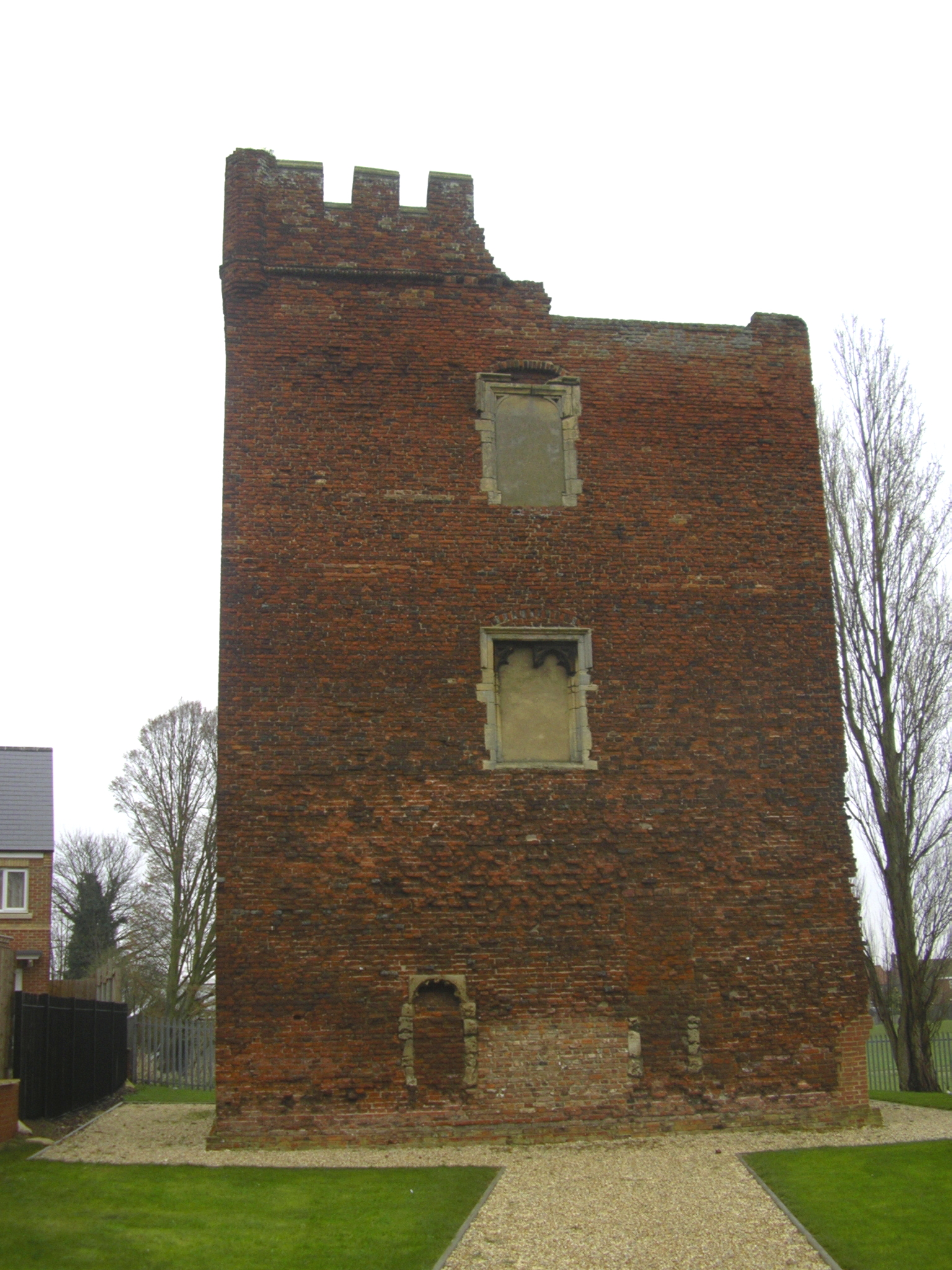

- Location within Lincolnshire

General information
- Type: Tower
- Coordinates: 52.973555°N 0.019517766°W

Hussey Tower is a historic tower, dating to c. 1450, located in Boston, Lincolnshire, England. It is a grade II* listed building. It was commissioned by Richard Benyngton, collector of taxes and Justice of the Peace for Boston.
