= Haven High Academy =

Location
- Marian Road; Boston, Lincolnshire, PE21 9HB; England; 52.98742°N 0.02557°W

Information
- Type: Academy
- Established: 1992
- Department for Education URN: 138754 Tables
- Ofsted: Reports
- Executive Headteacher: Austin Sheppard
- Age: 11 to 19
- Enrolment: 1,459 (2022)
- Badge: 2 H's. One Black and One Red.
- Website: www.havenhighacademy.net

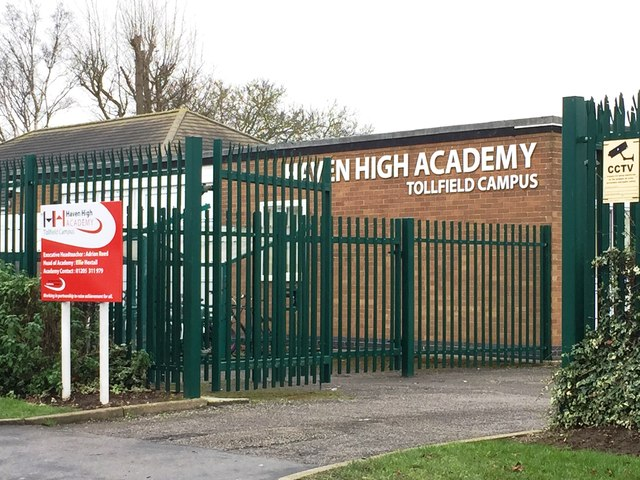
Tollfield Campus, where only the year 7’s attend.

Haven High Academy (formerly Haven High Technology College and Haven High School) is a secondary school with academy status located in Boston, Lincolnshire, England. Haven High is a member academy of Voyage Education Partnership (formerly BWAF, Boston Witham Academies Federation).

== History ==
The school came into being in September 1992 as the result of a merger of the then Kitwood Girls School and Kitwood Boys School.

== School campuses ==
The school has two campuses, Marian Campus being the main one and Tollfield being a separate campus for Year 7s and Year 8s (formerly a campus for 6th form students, then only year 7). The campus used to be the now defunct St Bede's Catholic Science College. The address of the Tollfield Campus is at 90-96 Tollfield Rd, Boston PE21 9PN. Both of the campuses are split into 'blocks', for example A block and E block.

== School inspections ==
Ofsted inspections of the school in 2016, 2019 and 2022 all resulted in reports of "Requires Improvement", the second lowest category of performance. This was despite an interim Ofsted monitoring report in December 2021 indicating that the school was making rapid progress in addressing the areas of concern.

The Ofsted inspection published in November 2024 reports the school as “Inadequate” for all sections except for Personal Development, which is “Requires Improvement”. The spokesman for the school said that they “strongly disagree” with the report.

== Controversies ==
In 2023, the BBC reported allegations that pupils at the school were part of a system of fights being planned for social media audiences. Earlier the same year, other student discipline issues were reported in the media. The same year, students organised protests, which were happening mainly at Marian Campus, featuring walkouts and not attending lessons. In April 2024, some teachers at the school went on strike in connection with the behavioural issues of students at the school.

In 2021 the assistant head of the school's music program was banned from teaching indefinitely after admitting having a sexual relationship with a pupil.

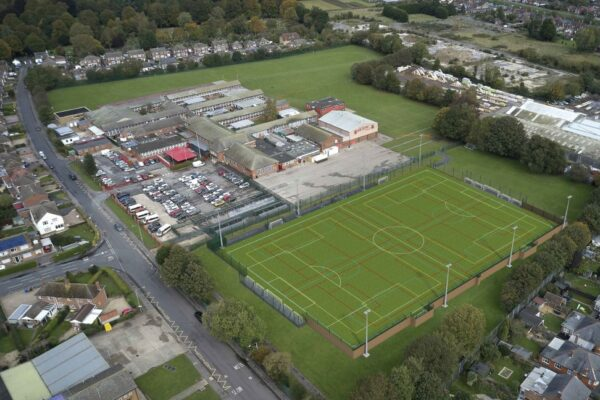
Used for football trainings after school, football at school, and PE sessions. Lit by floodlights, and access only from the school's tennis court. (MARIAN CAMPUS ONLY)
