= George French Flowers =

English composer and musical theorist

George French Flowers (1811 – 14 June 1872) was an English composer and musical theorist. He founded a society to promote counterpoint, and a music school for young singers.

== Early career ==
Flowers was born in Boston, Lincolnshire, the fourth son of the Rev. Field Flowers. He studied music in Germany with Christian Heinrich Rinck and Franz Xaver Schnyder von Wartensee, and went on to graduate BMus from Lincoln College, Oxford, in 1839. In 1865 he obtained DMus.

He was organist successively at the Chapel of the British Embassy in Paris, at St Peter, Vere Street, at St Mark's Church, Myddelton Square, at St John's, Paddington.

== Contrapuntist's Society and publications ==
Flowers founded the Contrapuntists' Society in 1843. In a letter to the Musical Examiner he wrote that the object of the society "will be the encouragement and promotion of a more scientific feeling in regard to music than hitherto has existed in England. My notion is ... that, to obtain admittance into the ranks of the society, a candidate shall compose a fugue, of at least one hundred and fifty bars in length, in each bar of which the subject shall be introduced.... A more generally scientific feeling infused among musicians, would go far to gain from them that respect from the members of other professions, which assuredly they do not now enjoy.... It will bring the most accomplished members of the profession together....

He was responsible for some contrapuntal and musical reviews in the Literary Gazette about that time, and was author of an analysis of John Goss's An Introduction to Harmony and Thorough-Bass in the Fine Arts Journal (1847, p. 445 et seq.).

His Essay on the Construction of Fugue appeared in London in 1846. It was reviewed in the Musical World: "Mr. Flowers has fought most manfully in support of counterpoint and fugal compositions.... his object was to draw the attention of students to the works of Sebastian Bach and other classical writers.... The essay under notice is an endeavour on the part of Mr. Flowers to carry his point, by giving examples and musical illustrations. There are 44 pages... containing a vast amount of detail on the subject.... There are several fugues... all worthy of the best attention of students, to whom we recommend the essay."

His Pictorial Representation of the Science of Harmony, a translation of Basler's Reisekarte, appeared in 1850, and a poem on Muscular Vocalisation in 1861.

Flowers introduced and developed Georg Joseph Vogler's system of progressive cadences. He contributed opinions on musical matters for many years to the Musical Examiner and Musical World.

== School of vocalization ==
In 1850 (Musical World, p. 650) Flowers announced that he would cultivate and bring forward English vocal talent by means of a British school of vocalization. He later organized concerts for his pupils. One of the concerts, in the Hanover Square Rooms, was reviewed in the Musical World in 1852: "This gentleman, having devoted his attention to the study of the voice, and the philosophy of the art of singing, has founded a class of vocalization, from which he invites the public to anticipate the most important results. His first practical appeal consisted of an entertainment in which his pupils, under his own direction, performed a selection of music from the most classical master. There were choruses, duets and solos.... Of Mr. Flowers' system we are not yet enabled to give an opinion; but it is fair to state that he has discovered and brought forward some very remarkable voices."

The school of vocalization did not endure. Mrs Howard Paul may be cited as having been its most distinguished member.

== Compositions ==
His compositions include organ fugues and choral fugues. His elaborate first mass, of about 1860, probably marks the date of his reception in the church of Rome.

Flowers died of cholera on 14 June 1872.
