= List of shipwrecks in January 1843 =

The list of shipwrecks in January 1843 includes ships sunk, foundered, wrecked, grounded, or otherwise lost during January 1843.

== 1 January ==
List of shipwrecks: January 1843
Ship	State	Description
Cessnock	United Kingdom	The ship was wrecked east of Puerto Rico. Her crew were rescued.
Clio	United Kingdom	The ship ran aground and was wrecked at Bridlington, Yorkshire. She was on a voyage from Sunderland, County Durham to Bridlington.
Hector	United Kingdom	The ship was wrecked at Savannah, Georgia, United States. She was on a voyage from Liverpool, Lancashire to Savannah.
Kanohasset	United States	The ship was driven ashore and severely damaged between Veurne and Nieuwpoort, West Flanders, Belgium. She was on a voyage from Newcastle upon Tyne, Northumberland, United Kingdom to New York. Kanohasset was refloated and taken into Ostend, West Flanders for repairs.
Shamrock	(United Kingdom of Great Britain and Ireland) New South Wales	The steamship ran aground off Sydney and was damaged. She was on a voyage from Moreton Bay to Sydney.

== 2 January ==
List of shipwrecks: 2 January 1843
Ship	State	Description
Elizabeth	United Kingdom	The ship was wrecked near Sydney, Nova Scotia, British North America. She was on a voyage from Sydney to Plymouth, Devon.
Ianthe	United Kingdom	The ship struck the Race Sand, in the North Sea and was consequently beached at Great Yarmouth, Norfolk. She was on a voyage from Hartlepool, County Durham to London. She was refloated on 5 January and taken into Great Yarmouth.
Slavros	Ottoman Empire	The ship was wrecked near Zakynthos, United States of the Ionian Islands. Her crew were rescued. She was on a voyage from Ibrail to Marseille, Bouches-du-Rhône, France.

== 3 January ==
List of shipwrecks: 3 January 1843
Ship	State	Description
Antonia	Sweden	The ship was driven ashore on Saltholm, Denmark. She was on a voyage from Norrköping to Gothenburg. She was later refloated.
Commerce	Belgium	The ship departed from Cuxhaven for Antwerp. No further trace, presumed foundered with the loss of all hands.
Flotilla	(United Kingdom of Great Britain and Ireland) British North America	The ship was driven ashore and wrecked at Portuguese Cove, Nova Scotia. Her crew were rescued. She was on a voyage from Demerara, British Honduras to Halifax, Nova Scotia.
Isabella	(United Kingdom of Great Britain and Ireland) British North America	The ship was wrecked on Campobello Island, New Brunswick. Her crew were rescued.
Janet Towers	United Kingdom	The schooner was wrecked in Loch Indaal. Her crew were rescued. She was on a voyage from Troon, Ayrshire to Ballyshannon, County Donegal.
Margaretha Elisabeth	Netherlands	The ship departed from Newport, Monmouthshire, United Kingdom for Dordrecht, South Holland. No further trace, presumed foundered with the loss of all hands.
Mayflower	United Kingdom	The brig was driven ashore and wrecked at Plymouth, Devon. Her crew were rescued. She was on a voyage from Grimsby, Lincolnshire to Plymouth.
Sarah	United Kingdom	The ship was wrecked on the Arklow Bank, in the Irish Sea off the coast of County Wicklow. Her crew were rescued. She was on a voyage from Cardiff, Glamorgan to Dublin.

== 4 January ==
List of shipwrecks: 4 January 1843
Ship	State	Description
Amity	United Kingdom	The brig was driven ashore and wrecked on Norderney, Kingdom of Hanover with the loss of at least three lives. She was on a voyage from Hamburg to Hull, Yorkshire. She floated off on 30 January and was driven ashore on Baltrum, Kingdom of Hanover.
Emma	United Kingdom	The ship sank in the River Gwendraeth. Her crew were rescued.
Hercule	France	The ship was driven ashore in the Petit-Rhône. She was on a voyage from Marseille, Bouches-du-Rhône to Cette, Hérault. She had become a wreck by 11 January.
Osmond	Hamburg	The ship was driven ashore at Dover, Kent, United Kingdom. She was on a voyage from Hamburg to Bahia, Brazil. She was refloated on 5 January and taken into Dover.
Redbreast	United Kingdom	The ship was driven ashore and damaged at Palermo, Sicily.
Seaton	United Kingdom	The schooner was wrecked at North Sunderland, County Durham. Her crew were rescued. She was on a voyage from South Shields, County Durham to Dundee, Forfarshire. Her crew were rescued.
Yarm	United Kingdom	The schooner was in collision with the brig Traveller (United Kingdom) and foundered in the North Sea off Spurn Point, Yorkshire. Her crew were rescued. She was on a voyage from Bridlington, Yorkshire to London.

== 5 January ==
List of shipwrecks: 5 January 1843
Ship	State	Description
Barbara Ann	United Kingdom	The ship was driven ashore on the Kenfig Sands, Glamorgan. She was on a voyage from Gloucester to Alicante, Spain. She was refloated on 17 January and taken into Port Talbot, Glamorgan.
Carolina	Sweden	The ship was wrecked near Marstrand. Her crew were rescued. She was on a voyage from Gothenburg to Hull, Yorkshire, United Kingdom.
Helen	United Kingdom	The ship was wrecked on South Uist, Outer Hebrides with the loss of a crew member. She was on a voyage from Glasgow, Renfrewshire to Limerick.
Leucadie	France	The ship was driven ashore and wrecked at "Lavrede", Spain with the loss of five of her crew. She was on a voyage from Gijón to Adra, Spain.
Paqueto do Hamburgh	Spain	The ship was driven ashore between "Levedo" and Santoña. All on board were rescued. She was on a voyage from Bilbao to Havana, Captaincy General of Cuba.
Python	United Kingdom	The ship was wrecked between Westkapelle, Belgium and Zoutelande, Zeeland, Netherlands. She was on a voyage from London to Antwerp and Brussels, Belgium.
Sir Peregrine	United Kingdom	The schooner was driven ashore and wrecked at Rhyl, Denbighshire. Her crew were rescued.
Susan	United Kingdom	The ship was driven ashore on Guernsey, Channel Islands. She was on a voyage from London to Jersey, Channel Islands.
Tampico	United Kingdom	The schooner was wrecked near Sligo with the loss of four of her seven crew. She was on a voyage from Limerick to Glasson Dock, Lancashire.

== 6 January ==
List of shipwrecks: 6 January 1843
Ship	State	Description
Eleonore	Belgium	The ship was wrecked at the mouth of the Danube. Her crew were rescued. She was on a voyage from Sulina, Ottoman Empire to Antwerp.
Friend's Glory	United Kingdom	The ship was driven ashore on Terschelling, Friesland, Netherlands. She had become a wreck by 10 January.
Indian	United Kingdom	The ship was wrecked on Mallorca, Spain with the loss of all but one of her crew. She was on a voyage from South Shields, County Durham to Marseille, Bouches-du-Rhône, France.
Isabella and Jane	United Kingdom	The ship was driven ashore on Terschelling. She was on a voyage from Copenhagen, Denmark to London. She had become a wreck by 10 January.
Pet	United Kingdom	The ship was wrecked on the Goodwin Sands, Kent. Her crew were rescued. She was on a voyage from Hull, Yorkshire to Portsmouth, Hampshire.
Ruth	(United Kingdom of Great Britain and Ireland) New South Wales	The ship struck rocks and sank in Neutral Bay.

== 7 January ==
List of shipwrecks: 7 January 1843
Ship	State	Description
Brilliant	United Kingdom	The ship was driven ashore near Büyükdere, Ottoman Empire. She was refloated with assistance from HMS Stromboli (Royal Navy).
Centenary	Netherlands	The ship was wrecked on the Banjaard Bank, in the North Sea off the coast of the Netherlands. Her crew were rescued. She was on a voyage from Alexandria, Egypt to Rotterdam, South Holland.
Glengarry	United Kingdom	The ship was driven ashore and wrecked at Savannah, Georgia, United States. She was on a voyage from Liverpool, Lancashire to Savannah.
Harkaway	United Kingdom	The ship departed from Key West, Florida Territory for Liverpool. No further trace, presumed foundered in the Atlantic Ocean with the loss of all hands.
Josephine	United Kingdom	The ship ran aground on the Shipwash Sand, in the North Sea off the coast of Essex. She was on a voyage from Thurso, Caithness to London. Josephine was refloated with assistance from the smack Rumley (United Kingdom) and HMRC Scout ( Board of Customs). She put into Harwich, Essex in a leaky condition.
Little Henry	United Kingdom	The ship was foundered in the North Sea 50 nautical miles (93 km) south south west of Flamborough Head, Yorkshire. Her crew were rescued.
Look-on	(United Kingdom of Great Britain and Ireland) New South Wales	The schooner was wrecked in the Chatham Islands.
New Thomas	United Kingdom	The brig was wrecked on the Shipwash Sand. Her crew were rescued by John and Mary (United Kingdom). She was on a voyage from London to Warkworth, Northumberland.
Robert and Mary	United Kingdom	The ship ran aground and was damaged at Emsworth, Hampshire. She was on a voyage from Sunderland, County Durham to Emsworth.

== 8 January ==
List of shipwrecks: 8 January 1843
Ship	State	Description
Duchess of Northumberland	United Kingdom	The ship was driven ashore and wrecked at St. Jago de Cuba, Cuba. Her crew were rescued. She was on a voyage from Liverpool, Lancashire to St. Jago de Cuba.
Luis Alfredo	Portugal	The ship was driven ashore and wrecked near Lisbon with the loss of all but two of her crew. She was on a voyage from Montevideo, Uruguay to Lisbon.
Monk	United Kingdom	The steamship was wrecked at Caernarfon with the loss of 22 lives. Six people were rescued. She was on a voyage from Porthdinllaen, Caernarvonshire to Liverpool, Lancashire.
Skimmer	United Kingdom	The ship was driven ashore at Beaumaris, Anglesey.
Two Sisters	United Kingdom	The ship was wrecked on Canna, Inner Hebrides. Her crew were rescued.

== 9 January ==
List of shipwrecks: 9 January 1843
Ship	State	Description
Childers	United Kingdom	The ship was wrecked in the Palawan Passage. Her crew were rescued. She was on a voyage from Singapore to Macao.
L'Habile	Russia	The barque was wrecked near Aigues-Mortes, Gard, France with the loss of all eighteen crew. She was on a voyage from Marseille, Bouches-du-Rhône to Cette, Hérault, France.
Jasmine	United Kingdom	The ship was driven ashore and severely damaged at Helsingør, Denmark. She was on a voyage from Stettin to London. She was refloated on 14 January and taken into Helsingør, where she was condemned.
Mina	United Kingdom	The ship was driven ashore on Sardinia. She had been refloated by 19 May and towed to Livorno, Grand Duchy of Tuscany, where she was sold on that date.
Sisters	United Kingdom	The ship was wrecked at "Caira". Her crew were rescued.
Speck	United Kingdom	The ship struck the Whitby Rock. She was on a voyage from South Shields, County Durham to Alexandria, Egypt. She was subsequently taken into Scarborough, Yorkshire.
Splendid	United Kingdom	The ship ran aground on the Nayland Rock, Margate, Kent. She was on a voyage from Belfast, County Antrim to London. She was refloated on 10 January and take into Margate.
Temperance	United Kingdom	The ship was driven ashore near Calais, France. She was refloated on 13 January.

== 10 January ==
List of shipwrecks: 10 January 1843
Ship	State	Description
Amiable Mathilde	France	The ship was driven ashore and wrecked at Port-Louis, Morbihan. Her crew were rescued. She was on a voyage from Bordeaux, Gironde to Calais.
Ann and Mary	United Kingdom	The ship was abandoned in the North Sea off the Newark Lightship ( Trinity House). Her crew were rescued by Mary (United Kingdom). Ann and Mary was on a voyage from Newcastle upon Tyne, Northumberland to London.
Calliope	Greece	The ship was wrecked near Chania, Crete. She was on a voyage from Chania to Rettimo, Crete.
Crescent	United Kingdom	The ship was driven ashore at Helsingør, Denmark. She was on a voyage from Saint Petersburg, Russia to Leith, Lothian. She was refloated the next day and taken into Helsingør.
Hester	United Kingdom	The ship was run ashore between Cape Cornwall and Land's End, Cornwall. Her crew were rescued. She was on a voyage from Cork to Southampton and Portsmouth, Hampshire.
John Lilley	United Kingdom	The barque was driven ashore and wrecked at Saunton Sands, Devon. Her crew were rescued. She was on a voyage from Liverpool, Lancashire to Old Calabar, Nigeria
Lady Eleanor Rogers	United Kingdom	The ship foundered in the Irish Sea off Walney Island, Lancashire.
Vintage	United Kingdom	The ship ran aground on the Gunfleet Sand, in the North Sea off the coast of Essex. She was on a voyage from South Shields, County Durham to London. She was refloated and out into Harwich, Essex.

== 11 January ==
List of shipwrecks: 11 January 1843
Ship	State	Description
Albion	United Kingdom	The ship was driven ashore and wrecked near Royan, Charente-Maritime, France with the loss of all hands.
Ann and ary	United Kingdom	The ship was driven into the breakwater and severely damaged at Southwold, Suffolk.
William	United Kingdom	The ship was driven ashore at Gibraltar. She was on a voyage from Alexandria, Egypt to Liverpool, Lancashire.

== 12 January ==
List of shipwrecks: 12 January 1843
Ship	State	Description
Augustin	United Kingdom	The ship departed from Youghal, County Cork for Portsmouth, Hampshire. No further trace, presumed foundered with the loss of all hands.
Brothers	United Kingdom	The ship departed from The Mumbles, Glamorgan for St. Ives, Cornwall. No further trace, presumed foundered in the Bristol Channel with the loss of all hands.
Dublin	United Kingdom	The ship was driven ashore at Swan Point, South Australia. She was refloated and resumed her voyage to Sydney, New South Wales.
George	United Kingdom	The brig was driven ashore and wrecked at Atherfield, Isle of Wight with the loss of two of her thirteen crew. Survivors were rescued by fishing boats. She was on a voyage from South Shields, County Durham to Grenada.
Hope	United Kingdom	The ship collided with Mary and Ellen off Saint Tudwal's Islands, Pembrokeshire and was abandoned by her crew. She was on a voyage from Liverpool, Lancashire to Aberdovey, Merionethshire.
Jane	United Kingdom	The schooner departed from Milford Haven, Pembrokeshire for Glasgow, Renfrewshire. No further trace, presumed foundered with the loss of all hands.
John and Isabella	United Kingdom	The ship was driven ashore and wrecked at South Shields. Her nine crew were rescued by the South Shields Lifeboat.
Lacon	United Kingdom	The ship departed from Ramsgate, Kent for Shoreham-by-Sea, Sussex. No further trace, presumed foundered with the loss of all hands.
Mary	United Kingdom	The brig was in collision with another brig in the North Sea off Flamborough Head, East Riding of Yorkshire and was abandoned by her crew. They were rescued by the lugger Rising Sun (United Kingdom). She was on a voyage from Ipswich, Suffolk to South Shields.
Percy	United Kingdom	The steamship was driven ashore and wrecked at South Shields with the loss of four of her eight crew. Survivors were rescued by the Coast Guard using rocket apparatus.
Quatre Freres	France	The ship was driven ashore and wrecked at Aigues-Mortes, Gard. Her crew were rescued.
Skeldon	United Kingdom	The ship was driven ashore at "Manksmans Luck", Kirkcudbrightshire.
William and Mary	United Kingdom	The ship departed from Waterford for Portsmouth, Hampshire. No further trace, presumed foundered with the loss of all hands.

== 13 January ==
List of shipwrecks: 13 January 1843
Ship	State	Description
Acorn	United Kingdom	The ship was driven ashore near Southport, Lancashire.
Active	United Kingdom	The ship was driven ashore at Pill, Somerset.
Aimable Celine	France	The ship was wrecked near "Haurtius". She was on a voyage from Bayonne, Basses-Pyrénées to Rouen, Seine-Inférieure.
Albert Edward, Prince of Wales	United Kingdom	The ship was driven ashore and wrecked on the Braunton Barrows, Devon. Her crew were rescued by the Bideford Lifeboat. She was on a voyage from Galway to London.
Albion	United Kingdom	The ship was driven ashore at Garlieston, Wigtownshire.
Albion	United Kingdom	The ship was driven ashore and wrecked near Deal, Kent.
Anders	Sweden	The ship was wrecked near Boulogne with the loss of all hands.
Ann and Avis	United Kingdom	The schooner capsized and sank in the English Channel off Dover, Kent. Her crew were rescued by the schooner Norden (Norway). She was subsequently driven ashore and wrecked at Dover, Kent. Ann and Avis was on a voyage from London to Chichester, Sussex.
Ann and Eliza	United Kingdom	The ship sank at Tenby, Pembrokeshire.
Ann & Elizabeth	United Kingdom	The smack was driven ashore at The Lynch, Somerset. Her crew survived. She was on a voyage from Bridgwater, Somerset to Milford Haven, Pembrokeshire. Ann & Elizabeth was later refloated.
Ann and Jane	United Kingdom	The ship was driven ashore at Wrangle, Lincolnshire. She was on a voyage from Boston, Lincolnshire to London.
Anne	United Kingdom	The sloop foundered in the Bristol Channel off the mouth of the River Avon. Her crew were rescued.
Atalanta	United Kingdom	The brig was driven ashore at Bognor, Sussex. She was refloated on 18 January and taken into Littlehampton, Sussex.
Belle	United Kingdom	The schooner was driven ashore in Deadman's Bay, Devon. Her crew were rescued. She was refloated the next day.
Bragilla	United Kingdom	The barque was driven ashore and wrecked in Bovisand Bay, Devon. Her ten crew were rescued by the Coast Guard. She was on a voyage from Plymouth, Devon to Falmouth, Cornwall.
Braunsberg	United Kingdom	The brig ran aground on the Maplin Sand or the Shoebury Knock Sand, in the North Sea off the coast of Essex. She was on a voyage from London to South Shields, County Durham. She was refloated the next day and taken into Sheerness, Kent.
Brothers	United Kingdom	The lighter was wrecked at Lytham St. Annes, Lancashire with the loss of two lives. She was on a voyage from Liverpool to Preston, Lancashire.
Caroline	United Kingdom	The ship was driven ashore on the coast of Somerset. She was on a voyage from Bristol, Gloucestershire to Tobago. She was refloated.
Celia	United Kingdom	The ship was driven ashore at Hemsby, Norfolk. She was on a voyage from London to Sunderland, County Durham. She was refloated on 15 January.
Ceres	United Kingdom	The brig collided with Rhine United Kingdom and was consequently beached near Sunderland. Severely damaged, she was refloated on 15 January and taken into Sunderland.
Ceres	United Kingdom	The ship was driven ashore at Margate, Kent. She was on a voyage from Seville, Spain to London. She was refloated the next day and taken into Margate.
Cereus	United Kingdom	The collier was in collision with another vessel and was consequently beached at Hendon, County Durham. Three of her crew were reported missing. She was refloated on 15 January.
Cleveland	United Kingdom	The schooner was driven ashore 4 nautical miles (7.4 km) east of Dunbar, Lothian. She was on a voyage from Antwerp, Belgium to Arbroath, Forfarshire.
Commerce	United Kingdom	The ship was driven ashore and wrecked at Salcombe, Devon.
Conqueror	United Kingdom	The East Indiaman was driven ashore and wrecked at "Lornel", Pas-de-Calais, France with the loss of all but one of those on board. Sixty-three lives were lost.
Cornubia	United Kingdom	The ship was wrecked near Maranhão, Brazil. Her crew were rescued. She was on a voyage from Calcutta, India to Maranhão.
Countess of Fortescue	United Kingdom	The ship was driven ashore at Swansea, Glamorgan. She was on a voyage from Cardiff, Glamorgan to St. Ives, Cornwall. She was refloated on 15 January and taken into Swansea.
Dart	United Kingdom	The schooner was driven ashore and damaged 2 nautical miles (3.7 km) from Aldeburgh, Suffolk with the loss of three of her five crew. She was on a voyage from Great Yarmouth, Norfolk to London. She was refloated on 1 February and towed into Woodbridge, Suffolk.
Dee	United Kingdom	The ship was lost in Liverpool Bay with the loss of all four crew.
Despatch	United Kingdom	The ship was driven ashore and wrecked at Mistley, Essex.
Diana	United Kingdom	The ship was wrecked on the Knock Sand, in the North Sea off the coast of Kent.
Dolphin	United Kingdom	The ship was driven ashore and wrecked at Porthdinllaen, Caernarvonshire.
Dove	United Kingdom	The ship was driven ashore at Salcombe.
Dove	United Kingdom	The ship was driven ashore at Abersoch, Caernarvonshire. Her crew were rescued. She was on a voyage from Cork to Liverpool, Lancashire. She was refloated on 17 January and taken into Pwllheli.
Diligence	United Kingdom	The ship foundered in the Bristol Channel off Grassholm, Pembrokeshire. Her crew survived. She was on a voyage from Newport, Monmouthshire to Aberdovey, Merionethshire.
Dykes	United Kingdom	The brig ran aground on the Maplin Sand or the Kentish Knock. She was on a voyage from Quebec City, Province of Canada, British North America to London. Dykes was refloated on 15 January and taken into Sheerness.
Ebenezer	(United Kingdom of Great Britain and Ireland) Jersey	The ship was driven ashore and wrecked at Thurlestone, Devon with the loss of a crew member. She was on a voyage from Jersey to Falmouth. She was refloated on 20 January and taken into Salcombe for repairs.
Edwin	United Kingdom	The brig was driven ashore and wrecked at Barmouth, Merionethshire with the loss of twelve of her thirteen crew. She was on a voyage from Chester to Barmouth.
Eglington	United Kingdom	The ship was driven ashore on Pladda, in the Firth of Clyde. She was on a voyage from Greenock, Renfrewshire to Mobile, Alabama, United States.
Eliza and Louisa	United Kingdom	The ship was driven ashore and wrecked on Caldey Island, Pembrokeshire. Her crew were rescued. She was on a voyage from Cardiff to "North Ross".
Elizabeth	United Kingdom	The ship was driven ashore 2 nautical miles (3.7 km) east of Pwllheli, Caernarvonshire. Her crew were rescued. She was on a voyage from Cork to Liverpool. She was refloated on 23 January and taken into Pwllheli.
Emerald	United Kingdom	The smack was driven ashore at Abersoch.
Emma	United Kingdom	The schooner was driven ashore at Lindisfarne, Northumberland. She was on a voyage from Sunderland to Alnmouth, Northumberland. Emma was refloated on 19 January and taken into Berwick-upon-Tweed, Northumberland for repairs.
Esther	United Kingdom	The ship was wrecked on the Gunfleet Sand, in the North Sea off the coast of Essex. Her eight crew survived.
Etty and Peggy	United Kingdom	The ship was wrecked at Peel, Isle of Man.
Euston	United Kingdom	The ship was wrecked on the Gunfleet Sand, in the North Sea off the coast of Essex. Her crew were rescued by a Barking smack.
Eveline	United Kingdom	The ship was driven ashore at Milford Haven She was on a voyage from Newport, Monmouthshire to Dublin.
Fame	United Kingdom	The ship was driven ashore at Penarth, Glamorgan.
Fortitude	United Kingdom	The ship was wrecked at "Usan". Her crew were rescued.
Friends	United Kingdom	The ship was driven ashore and severely damaged at Porthdinllaen. Her crew were rescued.
General Brock	United Kingdom	The brig was driven ashore in Batten Bay, Devon. Her crew were rescued by the Coast Guard. She was on a voyage from London to the Gambia. General Brock was declared a total loss.
George IV	United Kingdom	The sloop was driven ashore and wrecked at Hayling Island, Hampshire.
Good Hope	United Kingdom	The ship was wrecked on the Maplin Sand, in the North Sea off the coast of Essex.
Grande Père	France	The ship was driven ashore and wrecked at Genoa, Kingdom of Sardinia.
Hale	United Kingdom	The schooner foundered in Liverpool Bay off the Crosby Lightship (22px Trinity House) with the loss of four of her five crew. Her captain was rescued by the steamship Princess (United Kingdom) She was on a voyage from Creetown, Wigtownshire to Runcorn, Cheshire.
Henrietta	United Kingdom	The schooner was in collision with the schooner Salem (United States) and was driven ashore at White Nothe, Portland, Dorset, her crew having got aboard Salem following the collision.
Henry Brougham	United Kingdom	The ship was driven ashore and wrecked at Pakefield, Suffolk with the loss of all hands.
Hero	United Kingdom	The smack was driven ashore in Cawsand Bay.
Industry	United Kingdom	The ship was driven ashore and severely damaged at Selsey, Sussex. Her crew were rescued. She was on a voyage from Cork to Portsmouth, Hampshire.
Isabella	United Kingdom	The schooner ran aground on the West Hoyle Bank, in Liverpool Bay and was wrecked. She was on a voyage from Belfast, County Antrim to Runcorn, Cheshire.
Isabella and Sarah	United Kingdom	The ship was driven ashore and wrecked near Sunderland. Her twelve crew were rescued. She was on a voyage from London to South Shields. She was later refloated and taken into Sunderland, where she sank.
Isabella Black	United Kingdom	The ship was driven ashore 4 nautical miles (7.4 km) east of Dunbar. Her crew were rescued.
Jane and Mary	United Kingdom	The sloop sank at Caernarfon.
Janet	United Kingdom	The sloop struck the Mickery Rock, in the Firth of Forth and was wrecked with the loss of all seven of her crew.
John	United Kingdom	The ship collided with Emerald (United Kingdom) in the English Channel off Portland and was abandoned by her crew. She was on a voyage from South Shields, County Durham to Jersey.
John and Eliza	United Kingdom	The ship ran aground on the Hollywood Bank, in the Irish Sea off the coast of County Antrim and sank. Her crew were rescued. She was on a voyage from Donaghadee, County Down to Liverpool. John and Eliza was refloated on 18 January and taken into Belfast.
John and Isabella	United Kingdom	The brig was driven ashore and wrecked at Tynemouth, Northumberland. Her nine crew were rescued by the Tynemouth Lifeboat.
John and Susan	United Kingdom	The ship was driven ashore and capsized at Lower Coates, Lincolnshire. Her crew were rescued. She was on a voyage from Shoreham-by-Sea, Sussex to Stockton-on-Tees, County Durham. She subsequently became a wreck.
John & William	United Kingdom	The schooner was driven ashore and wrecked 2 nautical miles (3.7 km) west of Newhaven, Sussex with the loss of two of the seven people on board. Survivors were rescued by the Coast Guard using rocket apparatus. She was on a voyage from Great Yarmouth to Newhaven.
John Cummings	United States	The ship was driven ashore at Bootle, Lancashire. She was on a voyage from Savannah, Georgia to Liverpool, Lancashire. She was refloated on 15 January.
John Innes	United Kingdom	The ship was driven ashore at Great Yarmouth. She was refloated the next day and taken into Great Yarmouth.
John Lilley	United Kingdom	The ship was driven ashore and wrecked at Braunton, Devon Her crew survived. She was on a voyage from Liverpool to Old Calabar, Africa.
John Simes	United Kingdom	The ship was driven ashore at Great Yarmouth.
J. W. Collingwood	United Kingdom	The ship ran aground on the Maplin Sand. She was on a voyage from London to Sunderland. She was later refloated and taken into Sheerness, Kent.
Leagre Marie Peorine	France	The ship was lost 3 leagues (9 nautical miles (17 km) from Belle Île, Morbihan.
Lilly	United Kingdom	The ship was wrecked on the Taunton Sands, in the Bristol Channel. Her 26 crew were rescued by Appledore (United Kingdom). She was on a voyage from Liverpool to Old Calabar, Africa.
Little Test	United Kingdom	The schooner was driven ashore and wrecked at Hartland, Devon with the loss of all but one of her crew.
Louisa	United Kingdom	The ship struck a sunken wreck and was consequently beached at Hemsby where she was wrecked. She was on a voyage from Newhaven to Hartlepool, County Durham.
Loyalty	United Kingdom	The fishing trawler was driven ashore at Plymouth.
Lydia	United Kingdom	The ship was driven ashore on the coast of Suffolk.
Lydia	United Kingdom	The ship was driven ashore at Southend, Essex.
Margaretta	United Kingdom	The ship was driven ashore 2 nautical miles (3.7 km) east of Pwllheli. Her crew were rescued.
Mary and Elizabeth	United Kingdom	The schooner was driven ashore and wrecked 5 nautical miles (9.3 km) north of Barmouth with the loss of all but her captain. He was rescued by the Barmouth Lifeboat. She was on a voyage from Portmadoc to Lymington, Hampshire. Mary and Elizabeth was refloated on 20 January and put back to Portmadoc.
Mary and Elizabeth	United Kingdom	The ship was driven ashore at New Grimsby, Isles of Scilly.
Mayflower	United Kingdom	The ship was driven ashore on the coast of Somerset. She was refloated.
Moore	United Kingdom	The brig was driven ashore in Stokes Bay. She was on a voyage from Southampton, Hampshire to Sunderland. Moore was refloated on 28 January and taken into Portsmouth, Hampshire.
Nancy	United Kingdom	The ship foundered in the North Sea off Great Yarmouth with the loss of all six crew.
Panthea	United States	The ship ran aground in the Mississippi River downstream of New Orleans, Louisiana. She was on a voyage from New Orleans to New York. She was refloated and resumed her voyage.
Paquete de Bilboa	Spain	The ship was driven ashore and wrecked 11 nautical miles (20 km) south of Aberystwyth, Cardiganshire, United Kingdom. She was on a voyage from Liverpool to Cádiz.
Percy	United Kingdom	The brig was driven ashore and wrecked at Tynemouth with the loss of four of her eight crew. Survivors were rescued by rocket apparatus.
Percy	United Kingdom	The steamship was driven ashore 10 nautical miles (19 km) north of Tynemouth Castle with the loss of a crew member.
Peterhead Packet	United Kingdom	The ship was driven ashore and wrecked 8 nautical miles (15 km) east of Dunbar.
Petrel	United Kingdom	The ship foundered in the North Sea off Great Yarmouth with the loss of all five crew.
Phœbe	United Kingdom	The sloop foundered 3 nautical miles (5.6 km) north of Aberdovey, Merionethshire with the loss of all hands.
Phoenix	United Kingdom	The schooner was driven ashore 7 to 8 nautical miles (13 to 15 km) north of Great Yarmouth. Her crew survived.
Phœnix	United Kingdom	The ship was driven ashore at "Norwinstow", Cornwall with the loss of all hands.
Piper; Sydney and Jane	United Kingdom	The schooner Piper was driven into Sydney and Jane at Milford Haven, Pembrokeshire and sank. She was on a voyage from Waterford to Gloucester. Sydney and Jane was severely damaged. Piper was refloated on 4 March and taken into Hubberston.
Pomona	United Kingdom	The ship was driven ashore on the coast of Somerset. She was refloated.
Primrose	United Kingdom	The flat was wrecked off Gayton, Cheshire with the loss of both crew.
Prince Regent	United Kingdom	The schooner was driven ashore near Hove, Sussex. Her five crew were rescued by Coast Guard, using rocket apparatus. She was on a voyage from London to Portsmouth, Hampshire.
Reform	United Kingdom	The ship was driven ashore at Pill. She was on a voyage from Glasgow to Bristol.
Regina	United Kingdom	The ship was driven ashore at Garlieston.
Resolution	United Kingdom	The brig was driven ashore and wrecked at Orfordness, Suffolk. Her crew were rescued. She was refloated on 16 January.
Richard Carnell	United Kingdom	The ship was driven ashore at Quillebeuf-sur-Seine, Eure, France. She was later refloated.
Ringdove	United Kingdom	The schooner was driven ashore and wrecked near Ilfracombe, Devon.
R. N. Parker	United Kingdom	The ship was driven ashore in the River Usk.
Royal Oak	United Kingdom	The sloop was driven into by the brig Flora (United Kingdom) at Milford Haven and was consequently driven ashore in Castle Pile Creek. She was refloated the next day and taken into Milford Haven in a severely damaged condition.
Samarang	United States	The ship ran aground on the Brake Sand, in the North Sea and was damaged. She floated off but was consequently abandoned off Deal, Kent. Her 22 crew were rescued by the cutter Duke of York (United Kingdom). Samarang was on a voyage from New York to Hull, Yorkshire, United Kingdom.
Santon	United Kingdom	The barque was wrecked in Ballyteigue Bay, County Wexford with the loss of four of her crew. She was on a voyage from Calcutta, India to Liverpool.
Sao Joao	Portugal	The ship was driven ashore at Dieppe, Seine-Inférieure. Her crew were rescued.
Sarah	United Kingdom	The brig was wrecked at Bossiney, Cornwall. Her eight crew were rescued.
Sarah	United Kingdom	The ship ran aground on the Maplin Sand. She was subsequently refloated and taken into Sheerness.
Sarah Barry	United Kingdom	The ship ran aground on the Maplin Sand. She was on a voyage from London to Newcastle upon Tyne, Northumberland. She was refloated the next day and taken into Sheerness.
Sea Witch	United Kingdom	The brig was driven ashore in Batten Bay. Her crew survived. She was on a voyage from London to the Gambia. She was refloated on 16 January and taken into Sutton Pool.
Shamrock	United Kingdom	The ship was driven ashore near Strangford, County Antrim. She was on a voyage from Campbeltown, Argyllshire to Dublin.
Southampton	United Kingdom	The brig was driven ashore in Batten Bay. She was on a voyage from London to Gibraltar.
St. Mary's Isle	United Kingdom	The ship was wrecked in Port Yarrock Bay. Her crew were rescued.
St. Petersburg	United States	The ship ran aground in the Formby Channel and was severely damaged. Her 26 crew were rescued by a lifeboat and a tug. She was on a voyage from New Orleans, Louisiana to Liverpool. St. Petersburg was refloated on 15 January and taken into Liverpool in a waterlogged condition.
Suffolk Trader	United Kingdom	The ship was driven ashore at Southend-on-Sea, Essex.
Sutthoff	France	The ship was driven ashore at "Montulior". She was on a voyage from Bordeaux, Gironde to Antwerp, Belgium.
Two Brothers	United Kingdom	The ship was driven ashore at Southsea, Hampshire. She was on a voyage from Weymouth, Dorset to Langstone, Hampshire. Two Brothers was refloated the next day.
Tyro	United Kingdom	The ship was wrecked on the Woolsners Sandbank, in the English Channel. She was on a voyage from London to Porto, Portugal.
Vernon	United Kingdom	The ship was wrecked on the Burbo Bank, in Liverpool Bay with the loss of three of her eight crew. Survivors were rescued by the Magazines Lifeboat. She was on a voyage from Liverpool to Glasgow, Renfrewshire.
Waterlily	United Kingdom	The ship was driven ashore 2 nautical miles (3.7 km) east of Pwllheli. Her crew were rescued. She was on a voyage from Liverpool to Falmouth, Cornwall. She was refloated on 17 January and taken into Pwllheli in a severely damaged condition.
Wilhelm	Norway	The brig was wrecked at Arendal with the loss of 40 lives.
William	United Kingdom	The ship was driven ashore 1 nautical mile (1.9 km) south west Workington, Cumberland. She was on a voyage from Liverpool to Harrington, Cumberland. She was refloated on 18 January and taken into Workington.
William and Ann	United Kingdom	The ship was wrecked on the Gunfleet Sand. Her crew were rescued. She was on a voyage from Sunderland to London. She was later refloated and beached on the Essex coast.
William and Margaret	United Kingdom	The wherry was driven ashore and wrecked in Briskless Bay, County Donegal with the loss of five of her seven crew.
William IV	United Kingdom	The sloop was driven ashore in Stokes Bay. She was on a voyage from Cowes, Isle of Wight to London. She was refloated the next day.
Xiphias	United Kingdom	The schooner was driven ashore and wrecked 1 nautical mile (1.9 km) west of Boulogne. Her crew were rescued. She was on a voyage from London to Dieppe.
Yarborough	United Kingdom	The steamship was driven ashore at Southsea whilst assisting in the refloating of Two Brothers (United Kingdom).
Ythan	United Kingdom	The ship ran aground on the Andrews Sand, in the North Sea off Felixtowe, Suffolk. She was refloated and taken into Harwich.
Zephyr	United Kingdom	The ship was wrecked at Boulogne. Her crew were rescued.

== 14 January ==
List of shipwrecks: 14 January 1843
Ship	State	Description
Braunsberg	United Kingdom	The ship ran aground on the Shoebury Knock Sand, in the North Sea off the coast of Essex. She was on a voyage from London to South Shields, County Durham. She was refloated the next day and taken into Sheerness, Kent.
Elizabeth and Ann	United Kingdom	The ship was driven ashore in Carmarthen Bay.
Eliza Susannah	Netherlands	The ship was driven ashore at Hellevoetsluis, Zeeland. She had been refloated by 17 January.
Emily Louise	United Kingdom	The ship was wrecked on Caldey Island, Pembrokeshire. Her crew were rescued. She was on a voyage from Cardiff, Glamorgan to New Ross, County Wexford.
Felix	United Kingdom	The ship was driven ashore at Ramsgate, Kent. She was on a voyage from Hull, Yorkshire to Gibraltar.
George Canning	United Kingdom	The schooner was driven ashore and wrecked at Dunraven Castle, Glamorgan. Her crew survived. She was on a voyage from Newport, Monmouthshire to London.
Hope	United Kingdom	The ship was abandoned in the North Sea 14 nautical miles (26 km) east of the Newark Lightship ( Trinity House). Her crew were rescued. She was on a voyage from Sunderland, County Durham to London.
John Lilley	United Kingdom	The ship was driven ashore and wrecked on the Braunton Barrows, Devon. She was on a voyage from Liverpool, Lancashire to Old Calabar, Nigeria.
Lady Lilford	United Kingdom	The ship ran aground and was damaged at Limerick.
Lady of the Lake	United Kingdom	The ship ran aground on a rock off Ardglass, County Down and was severely damaged. She was refloated on 19 January.
Monarch	United Kingdom	The packet boat, a steamship was holed by an anchor and sank in the River Thames at Blackwall, Middlesex. She was on a voyage from London to Hull, Yorkshire.
Providence	United Kingdom	The ship was driven ashore in Angle Bay and was scuttled. She was on a voyage from Newport to Plymouth.
Rosebud	United Kingdom	The ship was driven ashore at Cherbourg, Seine-Inférieure. She was on a voyage from London to Jersey, Channel Islands. She was refloated on 19 January.
Royal Oak	United Kingdom	The ship was driven ashore at Pill Point, Somerset. She was refloated and taken into Pill, Somerset.
Sarah	United Kingdom	The ship foundered in the Atlantic Ocean off Tintagel Head, Cornwall with the loss of all hands. She was on a voyage from Neath, Glamorgan to Tynemouth, Northumberland.
Sesostris	United Kingdom	The ship was severely damaged by fire at Belfast, County Antrim. She was on a voyage from Glasgow, Renfrewshire to Savannah, Georgia, United States.
Wellington	United Kingdom	The ship foundered off Lytham St. Anne's, Lancashire. She was on a voyage from Waterford to Gloucester.

== 15 January ==
List of shipwrecks: 15 January 1844
Ship	State	Description
Bertholly	United Kingdom	The ship was driven ashore and damaged 8 nautical miles (15 km) south west of Barmouth, Merionethshire with the loss of a crew member. She was refloated on 19 January and taken into Barmouth.
Brake	(Russian Empire) Grand Duchy of Finland	The ship was abandoned in the English Channel off Boulogne, Pas-de-Calais, France with the loss of all hands. She was on a voyage from Newcastle upon Tyne, Northumberland, United Kingdom to Marseille, Bouches-du-Rhône, France. She was taken into Boulogne on 17 January.
Eliza	United Kingdom	The ship ran aground on the Maplin Sand, in the North Sea off the coast of Essex. She was refloated and taken into Maldon, Essex in a leaky condition.
Elizabeth Aletta	United Kingdom	The ship was wrecked at Crackington Haven, Cornwall with the loss of all twelve crew.
England	United Kingdom	The ship foundered in the North Sea 3 leagues (9 nautical miles (17 km)) off Ostend, West Flanders, Belgium. Her 21 crew were rescued by a Dutch pilot boat. She was on a voyage from London to Sierra Leone.
Guldencrone	Denmark	The ship foundered in the North Sea. She was on a voyage from Aarhus to Antwerp, Belgium.
Malvina	United Kingdom	The ship was driven ashore at the entrance to Strangford Lough. She was on a voyage from Campbeltown, Argyllshire to Wexford.
Maria Carolina	Kingdom of the Two Sicilies	The brig was driven ashore 2 leagues (6 nautical miles (11 km) from Audierne, Pas-de-Calais. Her crew were rescued. She was on a voyage from Messina to Liverpool, Lancashire, United Kingdom.
Merola	United Kingdom	The ship was driven ashore and wrecked at San Remo, Kingdom of Sardinia. She was on a voyage from Martinique to Marseille, Bouches-du-Rhône.
Owner's Venture	United Kingdom	The ship sank in the North Sea off Shoeburyness, Essex.
Pacific	France	The ship was wrecked at La Teste-de-Buch, Gironde. She was on a voyage from Bordeaux, Gironde to Saint Thomas, Virgin Islands.
Sarah	United Kingdom	The ship was abandoned in the Atlantic Ocean. Her crew were rescued by Bengal (United Kingdom).
St. Antonia	Grand Duchy of Tuscany	The ship was driven ashore at Livorno, Grand Duchy of Tuscany. She was on a voyage from Buenos Aires, Argentina and Montevideo, Uruguay to Livorno.

== 16 January ==
List of shipwrecks: 16 January 1844
Ship	State	Description
Anna	Spain	The brig was wrecked on the Goodwin Sands, Kent, United Kingdom.
Caroline Elise	France	The ship was driven ashore on Korčula, Kingdom of Dalmatia. She was on a voyage from Fiume, Austrian Empire to Havre de Grâce, Seine-Inférieure. She was refloated and resumed her voyage.
Dryas	France	The ship was driven ashore at La Rochelle, Charente-Maritime. She was on a voyage from Bordeaux, Gironde to Guadeloupe.
Economy	United Kingdom	The ship struck the pier at Great Yarmouth, Norfolk and was severely damaged. She was consequently beached.
Eendraght	United Kingdom	The ship ran aground at Dover, Kent. She was on a voyage from Dordrecht to Dover.
Elizabeth and Mary	United Kingdom	The ship was driven ashore at "Mount Sunchard2. She was on a voyage from Limerick to London. She was refloated and put back to Limerick.
Emma	United Kingdom	The ship was driven ashore and wrecked at St. Mary's, Isles of Scilly. She was on a voyage from Liverpool, Lancashire to Livorno, Grand Duchy of Tuscany.
Endraght	Netherlands	The ship ran aground at Dover, Kent.
George Miller	United Kingdom	The ship departed from "St. Mary", on the Gambia River for St. Jago de Cuba, Captaincy General of Cuba. No further trace, presumed foundered in the Atlantic Ocean with the loss of all hands.
Henry Bowser	United Kingdom	The ship was wrecked 8 nautical miles (15 km) north of Campbeltown, Argyllshire. Her crew were rescued. She was on a voyage from Belfast, County Antrim to Irvine, Ayrshire.
Hercules	United Kingdom	The ship was wrecked on the Goodwin Sands.
Irene	France	The ship struck the Breek Bank and foundered. Her crew were rescued. She was on a voyage from Dunkirk, Nord to Martinique.
Iris	United Kingdom	The ship was destroyed by fire at Klintehamn, Sweden.
Jessie Logan	United Kingdom	The East Indiaman was abandoned in the Atlantic Ocean off the coast of Cornwall with the loss of one of the 36 people on board. Survivors were rescued by the schooner Lynx (United Kingdom). Jessie Logan was subsequently driven ashore and wrecked at Boscastle. She was on a voyage from Calcutta, India to Liverpool.
Linnet	United Kingdom	The ship was driven ashore in a capsized condition at Boyndie, Aberdeenshire with the loss of all hands.
Robert and Henrietta	United Kingdom	The ship was driven ashore and wrecked near "Wastenooe". Her crew were rescued.
Shepherdess	United Kingdom	The brig was wrecked on the Goodwin Sands. Her crew were rescued by Earl Grey, Poll and Sparrow (all United Kingdom). She was on a voyage from Newcastle upon Tyne, Northumberland to Plymouth, Devon.
Solide	France	The ship was wrecked at La Teste-de-Buch, Gironde with the loss of all but one of her crew. She was on a voyage from Nantes, Loire-Inférieure to Lisbon, Portugal.
Zeelust	Netherlands	The galiot was driven ashore and wrecked in Ballyholme Bay. She was on a voyage from Glasgow, Renfrewshire to Lisbon, Portugal.

== 17 January ==
List of shipwrecks: 17 January 1843
Ship	State	Description
Frances	United Kingdom	The ship was abandoned in the Atlantic Ocean. Her crew were rescued. She was on a voyage from Liverpool, Lancashire to Savannah, Georgia, United States.
Stadt Berlin	Prussia	The ship ran aground on the Dragor Reef. She was on a voyage from Danzig to Antwerp, Belgium. She was refloated and put into Helsingør, Denmark.
Union	United Kingdom	The ship departed from Donaghadee, County Down for Bridgwater, Somerset. No further trace, presumed foundered with the loss of all hands.

== 18 January ==
List of shipwrecks: 18 January 1843
Ship	State	Description
Diana	United Kingdom	The brig was abandoned in the Atlantic Ocean (49°53′N 9°00′W). Her crew were rescued by Adelaide (United Kingdom). Diana was on a voyage from Bathurst, New Brunswick, British North America to Leith, Lothian.

== 19 January ==
List of shipwrecks: 19 January 1843
Ship	State	Description
Ariel	United Kingdom	The ship was abandoned in the Atlantic Ocean (49°08′N 11°12′W). Her twelve crew were rescued by Elizabeth Dennison (United Kingdom).
Beryl	United Kingdom	The schooner was discovered abandoned and waterlogged off Land's End, Cornwall by Chase (United Kingdom). The mate was found dead on board. She was towed into the Isles of Scilly.
Jane	United Kingdom	The ship was driven ashore at Filey, Yorkshire. She was on a voyage from Blakeney, Norfolk to South Shields, County Durham. Jane was refloated on 21 January and taken into Scarborough, Yorkshire.
John	United Kingdom	The ship was driven ashore at Hook of Holland, South Holland, Netherlands. She was on a voyage from Caithness to Dundee, Forfarshire. She was refloated on 24 January and taken into Maassluis, South Holland.
Niagara	United Kingdom	The ship was driven ashore at Whitburn, County Durham. She was refloated on 21 January and taken into Sunderland, County Durham for repairs.
Union	United Kingdom	The ship was driven ashore at the Flamborough Head Lighthouse, Yorkshire. She was refloated the next day and taken into Bridlington.

== 20 January ==
List of shipwrecks: 20 January 1843
Ship	State	Description
Adele	France	The ship was wrecked at Legé, Loire-Inférieure.
Caroline	United Kingdom	The ship was driven ashore at Mizen Head, County Cork. Her crew were rescued. A derelict vessel of that name was reported to have been taken into Holyhead, Anglesey by Emily and a pilot boat (both United Kingdom) on 22 January. Caroline was on a voyage from Liverpool, Lancashire to the Cape of Good Hope.
Douro	United Kingdom	The ship was wrecked on the Western Rocks, Isles of Scilly with the loss of all hands. She was on a voyage from Liverpool to Porto, Portugal.
Julius	Kingdom of the Two Sicilies	The ship ran aground on the Goodwin Sands, Kent, United Kingdom. She was on a voyage from South Shields, County Durham, United Kingdom to Palermo. Julius was refloated and put into Ramsgate, Kent.
Kingston	(United Kingdom of Great Britain and Ireland) Jamaica	The drogher struck a reef off Oracabessa and sank. Her crew were rescued. She was on a voyage from Jamaica to Mauritius.
Oak	United Kingdom	The ship ran aground on the Governor's Shoal, in the Irish Sea.

== 21 January ==
List of shipwrecks: 21 January 1843
Ship	State	Description
Active	Denmark	The ship ran aground on the Goodwin Sands, Kent, United Kingdom. She was on a voyage from Copenhagen to Saint Croix, Virgin Islands. She was refloated and put into Ramsgate, Kent.
Alwina	Bremen	The brig ran aground on the Goodwin Sands. She was on a voyage from Bremen to Charleston, South Carolina, United States.
Frasquita	France	The ship was wrecked in the Bay of Santander. She was on a voyage from Guayaquil, Ecuador to a French port.
Mersey	United Kingdom	The ship ran aground on the East Hoyle Bank, in Liverpool Bay. She was on a voyage from Porto to Liverpool, Lancashire.
Reliance	United Kingdom	The ship was driven ashore and wrecked at Saint Andrews, New Brunswick, British North America.

== 22 January ==
List of shipwrecks: 22 January 1843
Ship	State	Description
Alarm	United Kingdom	The ship was driven ashore at Kenmore Point, Ireland. She was on a voyage from Limerick to Ostend, West Flanders, Belgium. She was refloated on 30 January and taken into Galway.
Emma	United Kingdom	The smack was driven ashore and wrecked at the Old Head of Kinsale, County Cork. Her crew were rescued She was on a voyage from Swansea, Glamorgan to Kenmare, County Kerry.
Farvel	Norway	The sloop foundered off Tjeldøya. Her crew were rescued. She was on a voyage from "Rovar" to Stavanger.
Industriel	Chile	The ship was driven ashore and wrecked at Point San José, Mexico. She was on a voyage from Valparaíso to Guaymas, Mexico.
Laurel	United Kingdom	The ship capsized at "Coultersay" and was wrecked. She was on a voyage from Ballina, County Mayo to London.
Mary Steward	United Kingdom	The ship was discovered abandoned in the North Sea 70 nautical miles (130 km) north east of Cromer, Norfolk. She was towed into Harwich, Essex.
Providence	United Kingdom	The ship collided with Margaret (United Kingdom) and sank in the River Thames at Lower Hope, Kent. She was on a voyage from Guernsey, Channel Islands to London.

== 23 January ==
List of shipwrecks: 23 January 1843
Ship	State	Description
Adolphe	United Kingdom	The ship ran aground on the Gunfleet Sand, in the North Sea off the coast of Essex. She was on a voyage from London to South Shields, County Durham. She was refloated and taken into Harwich, Essex.
Alchymist	Ottoman Empire	The ship sank at Alexandria, Egypt. She was on a voyage from Constantinople to Alexandria. She was refloated on 31 January.
Charles Edouard	France	The ship was abandoned off the Île de Ré and was subsequently driven ashore there. She was on a voyage from Bordeaux, Gironde to Brest, Finistère.
Laing	United Kingdom	The ship was driven ashore at Boulmer, Northumberland. She was on a voyage from Narva, Russia to Antwerp, Belgium. She was refloated and out into South Shields for repairs.
Napoleon	Kingdom of Hanover	The galiot was in collision with another vessel and foundered in the English Channel off the coast of Devon, United Kingdom. Her crew were rescued by the barque Henry Shelton (United States).

== 24 January ==
List of shipwrecks: 24 January 1843
Ship	State	Description
Diana	France	The ship was driven ashore at Dungeness, Kent, United Kingdom. She was on a voyage from Havre de Grâce, Seine-Inférieure to Antwerp.
Fenelon	Belgium	The ship was driven ashore at Dungeness. She was on a voyage from Antwerp to Havana, Cuba. She was refloated on 26 January and taken into Ramsgate, Kent.
Findlay	United Kingdom	The ship was driven ashore and severely damaged at Redcar, Yorkshire. She was on a voyage from London to Hartlepool, County Durham. She was refloated.
Oriental	United Kingdom	The ship was run down and sunk in the Mediterranean Sea 90 nautical miles (170 km) north west of Malta by St. Lawrence (United Kingdom). Her crew were rescued by Racer ( (United Kingdom of Great Britain and Ireland) Jersey). Oriental was on a voyage from Liverpool, Lancashire to Alexandria, Egypt.
Spinster	United Kingdom	The ship struck the Crow Bar. She was on a voyage from Jamaica to London. She was taken into St. Mary's, Isles of Scilly.

== 25 January ==
List of shipwrecks: 25 January 1843
Ship	State	Description
Belina	United Kingdom	The ship departed from Plymouth, Devon for Newcastle upon Tyne, Northumberland. No further trace, presumed foundered with the loss of all hands.
Eliza	United Kingdom	The ship was driven ashore at Scalby, Yorkshire. She was on a voyage from Rouen, Seine-Inférieure, France to Whitby, Yorkshire. She was refloated and taken into Scarborough, Yorkshire.
Gertrude	United Kingdom	The transport ship was wrecked 7 nautical miles (13 km) north of Guindy, India. All on board, over 200 people, survived. She was on a voyage from China to India.
Malikal Bohor	United Kingdom	The transport ship ran aground on a reef 4 nautical miles (7.4 km) north of Pulicat, India. All on board, over 200 people, survived. She was on a voyage from China to India.
Merchant	United Kingdom	The ship was driven ashore at Kettleness, Yorkshire and was abandoned by her crew. She was later boarded by some fishermen and taken into Whitby.
Satiro	Ottoman Empire	The ship was wrecked at "Satalich", on the coast of Caramania. She was on a voyage from Smyrna to Falmouth, Cornwall, United Kingdom.
Thalia	United Kingdom	The ship was wrecked near Maranhão, Brazil. Her crew were rescued.
Victor	United Kingdom	The ship was driven ashore on Hirsholmene, Denmark. She was on a voyage from Pillau, Prussia to Hull, Yorkshire. She was refloated on 26 January and taken into Frederikshavn.

== 26 January ==
List of shipwrecks: 26 January 1843
Ship	State	Description
Alcemena	United Kingdom	The ship was wrecked near "Ceram Lant" with the loss of all but six of her crew. She was on a voyage from Bombay, India to China.
Ceres	United Kingdom	The ship ran aground at Ryde, Isle of Wight. She was on a voyage from Cowes, Isle of Wight to Sunderland, County Durham. She was refloated and resumed her voyage.
Gertrude	United Kingdom	The transport ship was wrecked on the Pulicat Reef. All on board were rescued. She was on a voyage from China to India.
Glide	United States	The ship was wrecked on "Caukun Iskand". She was on a voyage from Barbados to Comarca Lagunera, Mexico.
Ruth	(United Kingdom of Great Britain and Ireland) New South Wales	The cutter struck rocks and sank in Neutral Bay.
William	United Kingdom	The ship departed from Donaghadee, County Down for Liverpool, Lancashire. No further trace, presumed foundered with the loss of all hands.

== 27 January ==
List of shipwrecks: 27 January 1843
Ship	State	Description
Adventure	United Kingdom	The ship ran aground on the Barber Sand, in the North Sea off the coast of Norfolk. She was refloated.
Ann	United Kingdom	The brig struck the Barnard Sand, in the North Sea off the coast of Norfolk and sank with the loss of all hands.
Black Eyed Susan	(United Kingdom of Great Britain and Ireland) Jamaica	The ship was lost off Sandy Bay. She was on a voyage from Montego Bay to Kingston.
Ceres	United Kingdom	The ship was driven ashore at Ryde, Isle of Wight. She was refloated and resumed her voyage.
Content	United Kingdom	The ship departed from Liverpool, Lancashire for Bordeaux, Gironde, France. She was subsequently abandoned but was later discovered by Vernon (United Kingdom) and taken into Crookhaven, County Cork, where she arrived on 24 February.
Eagle	United Kingdom	The ship was run down and sunk in the River Thames 15 nautical miles (28 km) downstream of Gravesend, Kent. She was on a voyage from Great Yarmouth, Norfolk to London. The wreck was subsequently beached off Shoeburyness, Essex.
Eliza Scotland	United Kingdom	The ship was driven ashore at "St James's Castle", Smyrna, Ottoman Empire. She was on a voyage from Smyrna to Liverpool, Lancashire, She was refloated on 6 February.
Isabella and Eliza	United Kingdom	The ship was driven ashore on Lindisfarne, Northumberland and was abandoned by her crew. She was on a voyage from Bo'ness, Lothian to South Shields, County Durham. She had become a wreck by 30 January.
Maria	Sweden	The ship was driven ashore and wrecked at Klädesholmen. Her crew were rescued. She was on a voyage from "Ivica" to Uddevalla.

== 28 January ==
List of shipwrecks: 28 January 1843
Ship	State	Description
Arundel	United Kingdom	The sloop was driven ashore and wrecked at Winchelsea Beach, Sussex. All 26 people on board were rescued by a lifeboat. She was on a voyage from London to China.
Texiarcos	United Kingdom	The ship was driven ashore and wrecked at Rame Head, Cornwall. She was on a voyage from the Danube to Hull, Yorkshire.
Unione Fortuna	France	The brig was driven ashore at the Cow Gap, Sussex, United Kingdom with the loss of nine of the twelve people on board. Survivors Were rescued by the Eastbourne Lifeboat. She was on a voyage from Trieste to Dunkirk, Nord.

== 29 January ==
List of shipwrecks: 29 January 1843
Ship	State	Description
Alcmena	United Kingdom	The ship was lost in the Ceram Sea. Her crew were rescued. She was on a voyage from Bombay, India to China.
Chicora	United States	The ship was driven ashore in Bootle Bay. She was on a voyage from Charleston, South Carolina to Liverpool, Lancashire, United Kingdom. Chicora was refloated the next day.
Clarissa	France	The ship ran aground and was wrecked at Havre de Grâce, Seine-Inférieure. She was on a voyage from Saint-Domingo to Havre de Grâce.
Ebenezer	United Kingdom	The ship ran ashore at Newhaven, Sussex. She was refloated and taken into port.
George	United Kingdom	The barque was wrecked on "Life Island", Connemara, County Galway with the loss of a crew member. She was on a voyage from New Orleans, Louisiana, United States to Liverpool.
George McLeod	United Kingdom	The East Indiaman was wrecked in the Solway Firth. Her seventeen crew were rescued. She was on a voyage from Mauritius to the Clyde.
Sophie	Bremen	The ship ran aground on the Goodwin Sands, Kent, United Kingdom. She was on a voyage from Bremen to Havana, Cuba. Sophie was refloated and taken into Ramsgate, Kent.
True Briton	United Kingdom	The ship ran aground on the Cross Sand, in the North Sea off the coast of Norfolk. She floated off but consequently sank. Her crew were rescued. She was on a voyage from Sunderland, County Durham to London.

== 30 January ==
List of shipwrecks: 30 January 1843
Ship	State	Description
Army	United Kingdom	The ship was driven ashore at Clea Ness, Lincolnshire. She was refloated.
Hope	United Kingdom	The ship was driven ashore in Loch Indaal. She was on a voyage from Limerick to Glasgow, Renfrewshire.
Margaret	United Kingdom	The ship was driven ashore in Loch Indaal. She was on a voyage from Liverpool, Lancashire to Killala, County Mayo.

== 31 January ==
List of shipwrecks: 31 January 1843
Ship	State	Description
Amanda	France	The ship ran aground west of Bermuda. She was on a voyage from a port in the Republic of Texas to Havre de Grâce, Seine-Inférieure. She was refloated and put into Hamilton, Bermuda.
Copernicus	Prussia	The ship was wrecked on Bornholm, Denmark. Her crew were rescued. She was on a voyage from Pillau to a Dutch port.
Gabriel	France	The ship was abandoned in the Atlantic Ocean. Her crew were rescued by Ocean (United Kingdom). Gabriel was on a voyage from Nantes, Loire-Inférieure to Marseille, Bouches-du-Rhône. She subsequently came ashore on the coast of Portugal and was wrecked.
Helen	United Kingdom	The schooner struck a rock off Newton-by-the-Sea, Northumberland and sank. Her crew were rescued by the schooner Rose (United Kingdom). Helen was on a voyage from South Shields, County Durham to Montrose, Forfarshire.
Hope	United Kingdom	The ship was driven ashore in Loch Indaal. She was on a voyage from Limerick to Glasgow, Renfrewshire.
Margaret	United Kingdom	The ship was driven ashore in Loch Indaal. She was on a voyage from Liverpool, Lancashire to Killala, County Mayo.
Severn	United Kingdom	The ship was driven ashore at Maryport, Cumberland.
Soren Winkles Minde	Prussia	The ship was driven ashore in a capsized state at Bretignolles-sur-Mer, Vendée, France. She had departed from Memel in April 1842 for Porto, Portugal.

== Unknown date ==
List of shipwrecks: Unknown date in January 1843
Ship	State	Description
Africano	Grand Duchy of Tuscany	The ship was driven ashore and wrecked at Gaeta, Kingdom of the Two Sicilies. She was on a voyage from Genoa to Algiers, Algeria.
Autumn	United Kingdom	The ship was driven ashore on Mallorca, Spain. She was on a voyage from London to Marseille, Bouches-du-Rhône, France. She had been refloated by 18 February and taken into Palma de Mallorca for repairs.
Devonshire	United Kingdom	The ship was driven ashore at Maltreath, Anglesey. She had been refloated by 19 January and taken into Caernarfon.
Diana	United Kingdom	The brig was abandoned in the Atlantic Ocean 37 nautical miles (69 km) north north west of Cape Clear Island, County Donegal on or before 22 January. She was driven ashore and wrecked at Baltimore, County Cork on 27 January.
Dinah	United Kingdom	The ship was wrecked on the Ginger Key before 9 January. She was on a voyage from Liverpool, Lancashire to Matanzas, Cuba.
Dorothea	Netherlands	The ship ran aground on the Zwaantjesprogle. She was on a voyage from "Pasarouang", Netherlands East Indies to Amsterdam, North Holland. She was refloated and put back to Pasarouang, where she arrived on 13 January.
Eclipse	United Kingdom	The ship was lost before 19 January.
Forest	United States	The ship was abandoned in the Atlantic Ocean before 10 January.
Governor	United Kingdom	The ship foundered in the English Channel off Berck-sur-Mer, Pas-de-Calais, France before 21 January, possibly on 13 January.
Gracieuse Amelie	France	The ship was wrecked on Cape Breton Island, Nova Scotia, British North America with the loss of all hands before 10 January. She was on a voyage from Saint-Bruno, Province of Canada, British North America to Bayonne, Basses-Pyrénées.
Henrietta	United Kingdom	The ship foundered in the English Channel off the coast of Dorset before 17 January.
Hero	United Kingdom	The barque was abandoned before 11 January.
Jane	United Kingdom	The schooner ran aground on the Gunfleet Sand. She was later refloated.
Jemima	United Kingdom	The ship ran aground on the Gunfleet Sand. She was later refloated.
Julia	United Kingdom	The schooner ran aground on the West Rocks, off Harwich, Essex. She was later refloated.
Julius	United Kingdom	The ship ran aground on the Goodwin Sands, Kent and was damaged. She was refloated on 20 January and taken into Ramsgate, Kent.
London Packet	United Kingdom	The whaler was holed by a swordfish and was beached in the Bay of Islands.
Mary and Elizabeth	United Kingdom	The brig was dismasted and abandoned in the North Sea off the coast of Suffolk. She was subsequently taken into Harwich by the smacks Elizabeth and Star of Brunswick (both United Kingdom).
Milton	United Kingdom	The ship was driven ashore near the Gallipoli Lighthouse. She was refloated on 17 January.
Minerva	(United Kingdom of Great Britain and Ireland) Van Diemen's Land	The schooner was wrecked at Waipiro, New Zealand.
Nelson	(United Kingdom of Great Britain and Ireland) New South Wales	The cutter was driven ashore whilst on a voyage from Moreton Bay to Wide Bay. All on board were murdered by the local inhabitants.
Oberon	(Russian Empire) Grand Duchy of Finland	The brig ran aground on the Shipwash Sand, in the North Sea off the coast of Essex. She was refloated with assistance from HMRC Desmond ( Board of Customs).
Ocean Child	United Kingdom	The ship, a barque or brig, foundered in the Atlantic Ocean. Her crew were rescued on 1 February by Jessie (United Kingdom). Ocean Child was on a voyage from Liverpool to South Carolina, United States.
Pladda	United Kingdom	The ship was wrecked on the coast of County Donegal before 14 January.
Porter	(United Kingdom of Great Britain and Ireland) New South Wales	The brig was wrecked in the Torres Straits.
Raven	United Kingdom	The ship was driven ashore at "Cappa". She was on a voyage from Limerick to London. She was refloated on 21 January and put back to Limerick for repairs.
Royal Saxon	United Kingdom	The ship was driven ashore at Cork. She was on a voyage from China to London. She was refloated on 17 January and resumed her voyage.
Sally	(United Kingdom of Great Britain and Ireland) New South Wales	The ship was driven ashore at the mouth of the Richmond River before 17 January.
Sainte Catherine	France	The ship sank off Philippeville, Algeria.
Scotia	(United Kingdom of Great Britain and Ireland) Van Diemen's Land	The schooner was wrecked in the Bay of Fires. Her crew were rescued.
Thetis	United Kingdom	The ship ran aground on the Manicougan Shoals. She was subsequently taken into Cape Chat, Province of Canada, British North America, where she was wrecked.
Trois Fréres	France	The ship sank off Philippeville with the loss of four of her crew.
Victoria	United Kingdom	The ship was wrecked at Aberdovey, Merionethshire before 17 January.
Vulcan	United Kingdom	The ship was driven ashore in Strangford Lough. She was refloated on 19 January.
William and Nancy	United Kingdom	The ship was driven ashore and wrecked at Llanmadock, Glamorgan.
