= Grade II* listed buildings in Boston (borough) =

There are over 20,000 Grade II* listed buildings in England. This page is a list of these buildings in the district of Boston in Lincolnshire.

== List of buildings ==
Name	Location	Type	Completed (Note: The date given is the date used by Historic England as significant for the initial building or that of an important part in the structure's description.)	Date designated	Grid ref. (Note: The grid reference is based on the British national grid reference system, sometimes known as OSGB36, used by the Ordnance Survey.) Geo-coordinates	Entry number (Note: The "List Entry Number" is a unique number assigned to each listed building and scheduled monument by Historic England.)	Image
Bay Hall	Benington	House	c.1700	19 November 1951	TF3937046387; 52°59′48″N 0°04′31″E	1062079	Upload Photo
Burton Hall and attached wall	Fishtoft	House	Late 16th century	26 January 1967	TF3402845358; 52°59′20″N 0°00′17″W	1308496	Burton Hall and attached wall
Frampton Hall	Frampton	Country house	1725	19 November 1951	TF3251639352; 52°56′07″N 0°01′47″W	1147586	Upload Photo
Frampton House	Frampton	Country house	1792	26 January 1967	TF3026839850; 52°56′25″N 0°03′47″W	1360477	Upload Photo
Gates, screen, piers and wall to Frampton Hall	Frampton	Gate	1725	26 August 1987	TF3252939334; 52°56′06″N 0°01′46″W	1360474	Upload Photo
Hunwell House	Frampton	House	Early 18th century	26 January 1967	TF3214039106; 52°55′59″N 0°02′08″W	1062062	Upload Photo
The Priory	Freiston	House	Late 16th century	19 November 1951	TF3774943693; 52°58′22″N 0°03′00″E	1147704	Upload Photo
Old Vicarage	Wrangle	House	1704–07	26 January 1967	TF4251850914; 53°02′11″N 0°07′27″E	1307201	Upload Photo
Wyberton Park	Wyberton	House	Largely rebuilt 1761	4 February 1959	TF3283040730; 52°56′51″N 0°01′28″W	1062042	Upload Photo
10 South Street	Boston	Friary	After 1221	27 May 1949	TF3285043967; 52°58′36″N 0°01′22″W	1389000	10 South Street
Blackfriars Arts Centre	Boston	Arts centre	14th century	27 March 1949	TF3289643921; 52°58′34″N 0°01′20″W	1389013	Blackfriars Arts Centre More images
3, 5, 7 and 9 Spain Lane	Boston	Terrace	Early 18th century	27 May 1949	TF3286043916; 52°58′34″N 0°01′22″W	1389012	3, 5, 7 and 9 Spain Lane
Boston Sessions House	Boston	Sessions house	1841–42	14 February 1975	TF3271444262; 52°58′45″N 0°01′29″W	1388845	Boston Sessions House More images
Centenary Methodist Church and attached church hall	Boston	Church hall	1839	14 February 1975	TF3277244382; 52°58′49″N 0°01′26″W	1388976	Centenary Methodist Church and attached church hall More images
Exchange Buildings, 36–39 Market Place	Boston	Fish market	1770–72	27 May 1949	TF3278644029; 52°58′38″N 0°01′26″W	1388941	Exchange Buildings, 36–39 Market Place More images
Freemasons' Hall	Boston	Freemasons hall	1860–63	14 February 1975	TF3297444116; 52°58′40″N 0°01′16″W	1388927	Freemasons' Hall More images
Hussey Tower	Boston	Tower	Late 14th century or early 15th century	20 November 1975	TF3308643635; 52°58′25″N 0°01′10″W	1388981	Hussey Tower More images
Parish Church of St Nicholas	Skirbeck, Boston	Parish church	13th century	27 May 1949	TF3378943104; 52°58′07″N 0°00′33″W	1388859	Parish Church of St Nicholas More images
Shodfriars Hall	Boston	Guildhall	c.1400	20 November 1975	TF3285844000; 52°58′37″N 0°01′22″W	1388998	Shodfriars Hall More images
The Assembly Rooms	Boston	Assembly rooms	1822	27 May 1949	TF3274844055; 52°58′39″N 0°01′28″W	1388955	The Assembly Rooms More images
124–136 High Street	Boston	Apartment	c.1700	27 May 1949	TF3273743454; 52°58′19″N 0°01′29″W	1388898	124–136 High Street
118a, 120 and 122 High Street	Boston	Apartment	c.1700	27 May 1949	TF3274243486; 52°58′20″N 0°01′29″W	1388896	118a, 120 and 122 High Street
116 High Street	Boston	House	Early 18th century	27 May 1949	TF3274843534; 52°58′22″N 0°01′29″W	1388894	116 High Street More images
5 South Square	Boston	House	Mid-17th century	27 May 1949	TF3285443803; 52°58′30″N 0°01′22″W	1388991	5 South Square More images

== See also ==
- Grade I listed buildings in Boston (borough)
