= Grade I listed buildings in Boston (borough) =

There are over 9,000 Grade I listed buildings in England. This page is a list of these buildings in the district of Boston in Lincolnshire.

== List of buildings ==
| Name | Location | Type | Completed (Note: The date given is the date used by Historic England as significant for the initial building or that of an important part in the structure's description.) | Date designated | Grid ref. (Note: The grid reference is based on the British national grid reference system, sometimes known as OSGB36, used by the Ordnance Survey.) Geo-coordinates | Entry number (Note: The "List Entry Number" is a unique number assigned to each listed building and scheduled monument by Historic England.) | Image |
|---|---|---|---|---|---|---|---|
| Church of St Peter and St Paul | Algarkirk | Church | 1799 | 26 January 1967 | TF2912435289; 52°53′58″N 0°04′54″W | 1164857 | Church of St Peter and St Paul More images |
| Church of All Saints | Benington | Parish church | Early 13th century | 26 January 1967 | TF3971246511; 52°59′52″N 0°04′49″E | 1062077 | Church of All Saints More images |
| Church of St Swithin | Bicker | Church | 12th century | 26 January 1967 | TF2245737863; 52°55′27″N 0°10′48″W | 1062014 | Church of St Swithin More images |
| Church of St Andrew | Butterwick | Parish church | 13th century | 26 January 1967 | TF3876544924; 52°59′01″N 0°03′56″E | 1308528 | Church of St Andrew More images |
| Church of St Guthlac | Fishtoft | Parish church | 12th century | 26 January 1967 | TF3644842544; 52°57′46″N 0°01′48″E | 1147452 | Church of St Guthlac More images |
| Rochford Tower | Fishtoft | House | 1807 | 26 January 1967 | TF3509644496; 52°58′51″N 0°00′39″E | 1062088 | Rochford Tower More images |
| Church of St Mary | Frampton | Parish church | Late 12th century | 26 January 1967 | TF3257639169; 52°56′01″N 0°01′44″W | 1360476 | Church of St Mary More images |
| Church of St James | Freiston | Parish church | 16th century | 26 January 1967 | TF3772943770; 52°58′25″N 0°02′59″E | 1308415 | Church of St James More images |
| Church of St Peter and St Paul | Kirton | Church | Mid-12th century | 26 January 1967 | TF3049338527; 52°55′42″N 0°03′37″W | 1062022 | Church of St Peter and St Paul More images |
| Church of St Helen | Leverton | Parish church | 14th century | 26 January 1967 | TF3999547889; 53°00′36″N 0°05′07″E | 1062072 | Church of St Helen More images |
| Church of St Mary | Old Leake | Church | 12th century | 26 January 1967 | TF4074450281; 53°01′53″N 0°05′50″E | 1147754 | Church of St Mary More images |
| Church of St Mary | Sutterton | Parish church | Late 12th century | 26 January 1967 | TF2849235558; 52°54′08″N 0°05′28″W | 1360517 | Church of St Mary More images |
| Church of St Mary | Swineshead | Parish church | c.1300 | 26 January 1967 | TF2375340193; 52°56′42″N 0°09′35″W | 1232860 | Church of St Mary More images |
| Church of St Peter and St Paul | Wigtoft | Parish church | 12th century | 26 January 1967 | TF2628336230; 52°54′31″N 0°07′25″W | 1237405 | Church of St Peter and St Paul More images |
| Church of St Mary and St Nicholas | Wrangle | Parish church | c.1200 | 26 January 1967 | TF4248450854; 53°02′10″N 0°07′25″E | 1308367 | Church of St Mary and St Nicholas More images |
| Church of St Leodegar | Wyberton | Parish church | Late 12th century | 26 January 1967 | TF3286740831; 52°56′54″N 0°01′26″W | 1147881 | Church of St Leodegar More images |
| Fydell House and wall and railings and two urns | Boston | House | 1726 | 27 May 1949 | TF3285543876; 52°58′33″N 0°01′22″W | 1388995 | Fydell House and wall and railings and two urns More images |
| Guildhall and attached gate | Boston | Guildhall | Late 14th century | 20 November 1975 | TF3286543891; 52°58′33″N 0°01′22″W | 1389007 | Guildhall and attached gate More images |
| Maud Foster Windmill and Granary | Boston | Tower mill | 1819 | 27 May 1949 | TF3317244754; 52°59′01″N 0°01′04″W | 1389071 | Maud Foster Windmill and Granary More images |
| Parish Church of St Botolph | Boston | Church | c.1400 | 27 May 1949 | TF3269244184; 52°58′43″N 0°01′31″W | 1388844 | Parish Church of St Botolph More images |

== See also ==
- Grade II* listed buildings in Boston (borough)
