= Endeavour FM =

Coordinates: 52°58′51″N 0°01′36″E

107 Endeavour FM
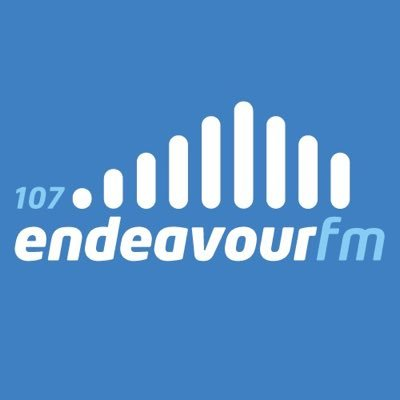

Boston, Lincolnshire; England
- Broadcast area: Boston, Lincolnshire
- Frequency: 107.0 FM
- RDS: EndeavFM

Programming
- Format: Community

Ownership
- Owner: Endeavour Radio Ltd

History
- First air date: 22 August 2016
- Former names: Stump Radio, Endeavour Online

Links
- Website: www.endeavourfm.co.uk

Endeavour FM is a local community radio station covering the area of Boston, Lincolnshire in England. Previously the station had been called Endeavour Online and Stump Radio, set up as a collaboration between Blackfriars Arts Centre and Tulip Radio which first started broadcasting in 2006 and returned yearly on a 28-day RSL until 2008. The station's name comes from HMS Endeavour, a ship of historical importance to Boston.

Endeavour FM has broadcast intermittently on FM with a community licence, and full-time on the Internet Until mid-2011, the studios were in the Boston Enterprise Centre at Wyberton Fen, before moving to a smaller 'stopgap' studio at Church Street. After a short return to the Boston Enterprise Centre, the station moved into a custom-built studio off London Road. The team then moved into the Black Sluice Lock Cottages, just before Christmas in 2018.

The station has live programming from 7 am – 11 pm daily. Specialist interest shows are aired daily from 7 pm, including reggae, rock, 1980's and dance.

In 2013 Endeavour FM compered the local Boston Christmas lights switch-on, The station has covered Boston Christmas Market, Boston Marketplace re-opening, Pescod Square events, Boston Music Festival, Butterfly Hospice bike ride, Boston Jubilee Picnic in the Park, Boston Standard's 100th anniversary, Boston Olympic Torch relay, Sibsey village fete and Boston Community Showcase, and has live commentary on Boston United FC home games. The station was affected by the 2013 floods, but stayed on air as long as technically possible, providing public information and official advice.

Endeavour FM's media projects have involved a local youth magazine, audio packages for businesses, media courses, a local online business directory and live events.

As of 22 August 2016, the Endeavour FM team now broadcast full-time on 107.0 FM across the borough of Boston.

The station can be listened to in the Borough of Boston on the frequency 107 FM and also online using Radioplayer UK. They also have an app available for iOS and Android devices. There is currently no compatibility with Windows Phone devices.
