= Morag McLaren =

- Born: 1957 (age 68–69); Edinburgh, Scotland
- Genres: Opera, musical theatre and cabaret
- Occupations: Singer, actress, director, coach

Morag McLaren (born 1957) is a Scottish soprano singer, director and vocal coach. She has performed in opera, musicals, concerts, one woman shows and cabaret acts.

== Early life and education ==
McLaren was born in Edinburgh and attended The Mary Erskine School. She graduated with a Bachelor of Education in Music at Lancaster University and trained as an opera singer at the Royal Northern College of Music, where she studied singing with Frederic Cox. She completed an MA degree with distinction in Performance Health and Personal Development at London College of Music.

== Performing career ==
McLaren played principal roles in the West End (Carlotta in Phantom of the Opera, in 1988–1989, and Mrs Segstrom in A Little Night Music with The Royal National Theatre in 1995–96). She also had principal roles with Scottish Opera (Lucy in Threepenny Opera in 1990) and Welsh National Opera (The Mother, the Dew Fairy and the Witch in Hansel and Gretel in 1990–1991).

She has also performed in cabaret acts alone and as part of Any Tessitura, a group comprising McLaren, David Bexon and Marion McCullogh and accompanist Tony Stenson, Iwan Llewelyn-Jones or Kelvin Thompson. McLaren has appeared at the Edinburgh Festival Fringe with a tribute to American librettist and lyricist Dorothy Fields titled Hey Big Spender, which she later performed in London. She was a founding member of Impropera, an opera improv group.

== Selected stage performances ==
Year	Show	Composer	Theatre	Role	Director / Company
1981	Tom Jones	Edward German	Holmfirth Civic Hall, West Yorkshire	Sophia	Holmfirth Choral Society
1986	Pagliacci	Ruggero Leoncavallo	Darlington, County Durham	Nedda	Opera Nova
1987	Le astuzie femminili	Domenico Cimarosa	Osterley Park Manor, west London	Bellina	Opera Italiana
1988	The Phantom of the Opera	Andrew Lloyd Webber	Her Majesty's Theatre, London	Carlotta	
1990	Threepenny Opera	Bertolt Brecht	Tramway Theatre, Glasgow; Macrobert Arts Centre, Stirling; Eden Court Theatre, Inverness; Grand Theatre, Blackpool, and other UK locations	Lucy Brown	Scottish Opera
1990-1991	Hansel and Gretel	Engelbert Humperdinck	24 venues in Wales and England, including the Sherman Theatre, Cardiff; Taliesin, Swansea; Maesteg Town Hall; Theatr Clwyd, Mold; Coliseum Theatre (Aberdare); Lyric Theatre (Hammersmith)	Witch, Mother and Dew Fairy	Welsh National Opera
1992	A Varied Evening of Musical Entertainment		Blackfriars Theatre, Boston, Lincolnshire; Duchess Theatre, Long Eaton; Robin Hood Theatre, Averham		Any Tessitura
1993	Tomfoolery		Canal Cafe Theatre, London		Sarah Jennings, Peter Crockford
1994	An Evening of Songs from Films and Musicals of the 70s and 80s		Blackfriars Theatre, Boston, Lincolnshire; Robin Hood Theatre, Averham		Any Tessitura
1994	Tomfoolery		Everyman Theatre, Cheltenham		
1994	Shameless!		Macrobert Arts Centre, Stirling; Byre Theatre, St Andrews	The Good Wife	Opera Circus
1994	Trouble in Tahiti	Leonard Bernstein	Purcell Room, Southbank Centre, London	Dinah	JCM Productions, Peter Crockford
1995	Love Songs for St. Valentine's Day; Songs from the Shows		Blackfriars Theatre, Boston, Lincolnshire; Duchess Theatre, Long Eaton		Any Tessitura
1995	Trouble in Tahiti	Leonard Bernstein	The Theatre Chipping Norton	Dinah	Jigsaw Music Theatre
1995-1996	A Little Night Music	Stephen Sondheim	Olivier, National Theatre		Royal National Theatre
1996	Cabaret with Morag McLaren		Hebden Bridge Little Theatre, West Yorkshire		
1998, 1999	I Never Do Anything Twice		Wadhurst; Vinehall Theatre, Robertsbridge, East Sussex	Solo performer	
1999	Impropera		Loughborough Town Hall		Opera Circus
1999-2002	Hey Big Spender (A tribute to Dorothy Fields)	Dorothy Fields	Hills Street Theatre, Edinburgh Fringe Festival (1999); Pizza on the Park, Knightsbridge (2000); Purcell Room, Southbank Centre, London (2002)	Solo performer	
2005	Lola Blau: Morag McLaren	Georg Kreisler	New End Theatre, Hampstead	Lola Blau	Mark Tinkler, Bruce O'Neil
2006, 2008	Impropera		Jermyn Street Theatre, London; Leicester Square Theatre, London		

== Directing and coaching ==
McLaren was the founder and principal trustee of The Cooper Hall Foundation charity, which promoted music performances, education and the development of creative projects at Cooper Hall near Frome, Somerset. There, between 2013 and 2015, she directed the operas The Turn of the Screw, Hansel and Gretel, and Cosi Fan Tutte for Frome Festival, in collaboration with Bath Philharmonia, with a workshop focus. She was appointed Patron of Frome Festival in 2013.

McLaren also directed Dido and Aeneas at London College of Music. With mezzo-soprano Theresa Goble, she co-founded Vox Integra in 2012, which offered vocal coaching.

She is one of 20 opera singers featured in the 2018 book Opera Lives by Linda Kitchen.

== Personal life ==
She is married to a director of a US investment bank, and has two adult children. Her son Gregor Riddell is a professional cellist and composer, and her daughter Kirsty Riddell is an artist.
