= List of shipwrecks in April 1860 =

The list of shipwrecks in April 1860 includes ships sunk, foundered, grounded, or otherwise lost during April 1860.

== 1 April ==
List of shipwrecks: 1 April 1860
Ship	State	Description
Caroline	(United Kingdom of Great Britain and Ireland) New Zealand	The barque was wrecked when she grounded on a sandbar at the mouth of the New River in southern New Zealand. She was lying low in the water due to a heavy cargo of coal.
Dauntless	United Kingdom	The smack was driven ashore at Towyn Point, Glamorgan. She was on a voyage from Liverpool, Lancashire to Carmarthen.
Frederic Gustave	France	The ship foundered 36 nautical miles (67 km) west south west of Start Point, Devon, United Kingdom. Her crew were rescued by John Masterman (United Kingdom). Frederic Gustave was on a voyage rom Bordeaux, Gironde to Queenstown, County Cork, United Kingdom.
General Grant	United Kingdom	The schooner was lost at Anguilla.
John Wesley	United Kingdom	The schooner was driven ashore at Duncansby Head, Caithness. Her crew survived. She was on a voyage from London to Dumfries. John Wesley had become a wreck by 4 April.
Notre Dame de Bon Port	France	The ship was driven ashore and scuttled at Swansea, Glamorgan, United Kingdom. She was on a voyage from Nantes, Loire-Inférieure to Swansea. Notre Dame de Bon Port was refloated on 3 April with the assistance of three tugs.
Oberon	United Kingdom	The barque ran aground on Sarn Badrig and was abandoned. Her fifteen crew were rescued by the Portmadoc Lifeboat. She was on a voyage from Macao, China to Liverpool, Lancashire. She floated off and came ashore on Shell Island, Caernarfonshire.
Vivid	United Kingdom	The schooner was driven ashore in Plettenberg Bay. Her six crew survived. She was on a voyage from Cape Town, Cape Colony to Table Bay.

== 2 April ==
List of shipwrecks: 2 April 1860
Ship	State	Description
Alphonsine Estelle	United Kingdom	The schooner sank off Dungeness, Kent, United Kingdom. Her crew were rescued by a Deal lugger. She was on a voyage from Sunderland, County Durham, United Kingdom to Nantes, Loire-Inférieure.
Dominica	United Kingdom	The brig was destroyed by fire in the Atlantic Ocean. Her eleven crew survived. She was on a voyage from Dominica to London.
Fort George	United Kingdom	The ship ran aground on the Diamond Sand, in the Hooghly River. She was on a voyage from Liverpool, Lancashire to Calcutta, India. She was refloated on 7 April and taken in to Calcutta.
Susan Emily	United Kingdom	The ship was wrecked at New Orleans, Louisiana, United States. She was on a voyage from Cárdenas, Cuba to New Orleans.
Yrca	United Kingdom	The full-rigged ship caught fire off the Isles of Scilly. She sank the next day. Her 30 crew were rescued by the schooner Empress (United Kingdom). She was on a voyage from Birkenhead, Cheshire to Bombay, India.

== 3 April ==
List of shipwrecks: 3 April 1860
Ship	State	Description
Fanny Holmes	United States	The barque was destroyed by fire at Apalachicola, Florida.
Forsoget	Norway	The ship was driven ashore at Fraserburgh, Aberdeenshire, United Kingdom. She was refloated the next day and taken in to Fraserburgh in a severely damaged condition.
Jane	United Kingdom	The brig ran aground on the Holm Sand, in the North Sea off the coast of Suffolk. She was on a voyage from South Shields, County Durham to London. She was refloated and taken in to Lowestoft, Suffolk in a leaky condition.

== 4 April ==
List of shipwrecks: 4 April 1860
Ship	State	Description
Ellen	United Kingdom	The ship ran aground off Great Yarmouth, Norfolk. She was refloated and taken in to Great Yarmouth in a leaky condition.
Emanuel	Kingdom of Hanover	The ship was driven ashore and wrecked at Prestonpans, Lothian, United Kingdom. She was on a voyage from Brake to Cockenzie, Lothian.
Fiery Cross	United Kingdom	The full-rigged ship was wrecked on a reef near the Investigator Shoal, in the South China Sea. All 30 crew were rescued. She was on a voyage from London to Hong Kong.
Hannah	United Kingdom	The cutter foundered off Baboon Point, Cape Colony. She was on a voyage from Lambert's Bay to Table Bay.
Maria	United Kingdom	The schooner was driven ashore at Lossiemouth, Moray. She was on a voyage from Lossiemouth to Burghead. She was refloated the next day and taken in to Lossiemouth.
Saladin	United Kingdom	The steamship was driven ashore at Egremont, Cheshire. She was on a voyage from Liverpool, Lancashire to Jamaica.

== 5 April ==
List of shipwrecks: 5 April 1860
Ship	State	Description
Alceste	United Kingdom	The barque struck a sunken rock off the Longships Lighthouse, Cornwall and foundered. Her crew were rescued by Sarah (United Kingdom). Alceste was on a voyage from Cardiff, Glamorgan to Southampton, Hampshire.
Benin	United Kingdom	The ship was driven ashore and wrecked at Benin.
Black Hawk	United States	The ship capsized and sank in the Bay of Bengal with the loss of all on board. She was on a voyage from Calcutta, India to Boston, Massachusetts.
John Purdie	United Kingdom	The schooner, in ballast, struck a sunken rock near the Runnel Stone off Gwennap Head, Cornwall and sank. Her crew escaped in the ship′s boat; they were rescuced by Kellow (United Kingdom). John Purdie was on a voyage from St Michael's Mount, Cornwall, to Llanelly, Glamorgan.
Sextus	United Kingdom	The sailing barge capsized at Harwich, Essex. Her crew were rescued. She was on a voyage from Great Yarmouth, Norfolk to Sheerness, Kent.
Surprise	United Kingdom	The schooner was run down and sunk off the coast of Pembrokeshire by Isabella (United Kingdom). She was on a voyage from Cardiff, Glamorgan to Liverpool, Lancashire. She was raised on 26 August.
Vigo	United Kingdom	The ship collided with the steamship Baron Osy (Belgium) and sank in the River Thames.
Weddrington	United Kingdom	The barque ran aground at Caen, Calvados, France. She was on a voyage from Blyth, Northumberland to Caen.

== 6 April ==
List of shipwrecks: 6 April 1860
Ship	State	Description
Harvest	United Kingdom	The ship departed from Mobile, Alabama, United States for Liverpool, Lancashire. No further trace, presumed foundered with the loss of all hands.
Tiverton	United Kingdom	The ship ran aground on the Pampus, off the coast of Zeeland, Netherlands. She was on a voyage from Rotterdam, South Holland, Netherlands to Runcorn, Cheshire.

== 7 April ==
List of shipwrecks: 7 April 1860
Ship	State	Description
Despatch	United Kingdom	The schooner collided with the full-rigged ship Jeunesse (France) and foundered with the loss of two of her seven crew. Survivors were rescued by Jeunesse. Despatch was on a voyage from Marseille, Bouches-du-Rhône, France to the Clyde
Fatul Karlem	Netherlands East Indies	The barque was destroyed by fire at Ternate.
Friedrich Wilhelm	Prussia	The ship ran aground at Memel. She was on a voyage from Memel to Dublin, United Kingdom. She was refloated.
Maria	United Kingdom	The ship was driven ashore at Memel. She was on a voyage from Memel to Gloucester. She was refloated.
Moorsfort	United Kingdom	The ship ran aground in Tombeau Bay. She was on a voyage from Calcutta, India to Mauritius. She was refloated with the assistance of a tug and completed her voyage.
Nancy	United Kingdom	The ship collided with Express (United Kingdom) and sank in the River Thames with the loss of two of her crew.
William	United Kingdom	The ship was driven ashore at Villaricos, Spain. She was on a voyage from Cartagena, Spain to the River Tyne.

== 8 April ==
List of shipwrecks: 8 April 1860
Ship	State	Description
Alva	(United Kingdom of Great Britain and Ireland) British North America	The schooner was wrecked on the coast of North Carolina, United States. her crew were rescued. She was on a voyage from Savannah, Georgia, United States to Saint John, New Brunswick.
Jankina	Netherlands	The galiot foundered in the Atlantic Ocean (46°45′N 8°30′W). Her crew were rescued by the brig Galatea ( Kingdom of Sardinia). Jankina was on a voyage from Ayr, United Kingdom to Seville, Spain.
Maria	United Kingdom	The brig was beached 7 leagues (21 nautical miles (39 km)) north east of Bastia, Corsica, France. Her ten crew survived. She was on a voyage from Genoa, Kingdom of Sardinia to Constantinople, Ottoman Empire.

== 9 April ==
List of shipwrecks: 9 April 1860
Ship	State	Description
Earsdon	United Kingdom	The steamship was driven ashore at Nyhavn, Denmark. Her sixteen crew survived. She was on a voyage from Havre de Grâce, Seine-Inférieure, France to Libava, Courland Governorate.
Nancy	United Kingdom	The brigantine ran aground on the Horse Bank, in the Irish Sea off the coast of Lancashire. Her nine crew were rescued by the Lytham Lifeboat. She was on a voyage from Tynemouth, Northumberland to Liverpool, Lancashire. She had become a wreck by 11 April.
William	United Kingdom	The schooner ran aground on the Holm Sand, in the North Sea off the coast of Suffolk. She was refloated the next day and taken in to Lowestoft, Suffolk.

== 10 April ==
List of shipwrecks: 10 April 1860
Ship	State	Description
Marthina Catharina	Denmark	The ship was driven ashore and wrecked at Rønne.

== 11 April ==
List of shipwrecks: 11 April 1860
Ship	State	Description
Hedwig	Russia	The full-rigged ship foundered. Her crew were rescued by Johker van Stogteren (Flag unknown). Hedwig was on a voyage from Newport, Monmouthshire, United Kingdom to Saint Thomas, Virgin Islands.
Jacob A. Westervelt	United States	The full-rigged ship was destroyed by fire at New York. Her passengers and crew were rescued by the steamboat Magnolia ( New York City Police Department).
Mary A. McLeod	United Kingdom	The smack collided with the steamship Rebecca (United Kingdom) and sank in the Firth of Clyde. Her three crew were rescued by Rebecca. Mary A. McLeod was on a voyage from Easdale, Argyllshire to Glasgow, Renfrewshire.

== 12 April ==
List of shipwrecks: 12 April 1860
Ship	State	Description
Creole	United Kingdom	The schooner was wrecked on the Sow and Pigs Rocks, in the North Sea off the coast of Northumberland. Her crew were rescued. She was being towed from the River Tyne to Amble, Northumberland.
Fairy	United Kingdom	The barque was lost on the coast of Greenland. Her 50 crew were rescued. She was on a voyage from Peterhead, Aberdeenshire to Greenland.
Sirene	France	The ship ran aground at the mouth of the Tréguier River. She was on a voyage from Newcastle upon Tyne, Northumberland to Redon, Ille-et-Vilaine.
St. Peter and St. Paul	United Kingdom	The ship ran aground on the Spijkerplaat, in the North Sea off the coast of Zeeland, Netherlands. She was on a voyage from Liverpool, Lancashire to Antwerp, Belgium.
Themis, or Thetis	Sweden or Norway	The brigantine was wrecked near "Braciotto", Kingdom of Sardinia with the loss of all seven people on board.

== 13 April ==
List of shipwrecks: 13 April 1860
Ship	State	Description
Aerolite	United Kingdom	The barque was abandoned in the Indian Ocean. All nineteen people on board survived. She was on a voyage from Singapore, Straits Settlements to Akyab, Burma.
Hope	United Kingdom	The schooner sank 14 nautical miles (26 km) north east of Berwick upon Tweed, Northumberland. Her crew survived. She was on a voyage from South Shields, County Durham to Perth.
Jane	United Kingdom	The brig was damaged by fire at Hamburg with the loss of a crew member. She was on a voyage from Middlesbrough, Yorkshire to Hamburg.
Jan Zylker	Netherlands	The galiot sprang a leak and foundered 30 nautical miles (56 km) north west of Ouessant, Finistère, France. Her crew were rescued by the barque Baron H. Adersveld (United Kingdom). Jan Zylker was on a voyage from Middlesbrough, Yorkshire, United Kingdom to Trieste.
R. L. Fay	United States	The schooner caught fire at Savannah, Georgia and was scuttled.

== 14 April ==
List of shipwrecks: 14 April 1860
Ship	State	Description
Brothers	United Kingdom	The ship departed from Newcastle upon Tyne, Northumberland for Brixham, Devon. No further trace, presumed foundered with the loss of all hands.
Jane	United Kingdom	The brig was damaged by fire at Hamburg with the loss of a crew member.
Jane Frances	United Kingdom	The barque was damaged by fire in the North River, New York, United States.
Newcastle	United Kingdom	The ship ran aground at Liverpool, Lancashire. She was on a voyage from Liverpool to Corfu, United States of the Ionian Islands. She was refloated and put back to Liverpool.

== 15 April ==
List of shipwrecks: 15 April 1860
Ship	State	Description
Anna Arendina	Russia	The ship collided with a Norwegian barque and foundered in the North Sea. Her crew were rescued. She was on a voyage from Liverpool, Lancashire, United Kingdom to Narva.
Belle	United States	The barque collided with Invincible (United States) and sank in the Atlantic Ocean. Her crew were rescued by Invincible and the brig A. Milliken (United States). Belle was on a voyage from Boston, Massachusetts to Philadelphia, Pennsylvania.
Flora	United Kingdom	The brig foundered in the North Sea 120 nautical miles (220 km) off Flamborough Head, Yorkshire. Her eight crew were rescued. She was on a voyage from Sunderland, County Durham to Hamburg.
Gezina Mensinga	Prussia	The koff was driven ashore and wrecked at Helsingborg Sweden. She was on a voyage from Königsberg to the River Tyne.
Lady Bruce	United Kingdom	The barque foundered in the Atlantic Ocean. Her sixteen crew took to the boats; they were rescued six days later by the barque Dunbrody (United Kingdom). Lady Bruce was on a voyage from Troon, Ayrshire to Quebec City, Province of Canada, British North America.

== 16 April ==
List of shipwrecks: 16 April 1860
Ship	State	Description
Anna Bertha	Netherlands	The ship ran aground off Hellevoetsluis, Zeeland. She was refloated.

== 17 April ==
List of shipwrecks: 17 April 1860
Ship	State	Description
Eamont	United Kingdom	The ship ran aground on the Herd Sand, in the North Sea off the coast of County Durham. She was refloated the next day with assistance from three steamships.
Lucinda	United Kingdom	The brig was wrecked on Grand Bahama, Bahamas. Her eight crew survived. She was on a voyage from Matanzas, Cuba to Queenstown, County Cork.
Perseverance	United Kingdom	The smack was driven ashore and wrecked at Holyhead, Anglesey. Her crew were rescued. She was on a voyage from Rye, Sussex to Holyhead.

== 18 April ==
List of shipwrecks: 18 April 1860
Ship	State	Description
Segunda Clavinella	Spain	The ship struck the Cochinos and sank. Her crew were rescued.
Emerald Isle	United Kingdom	The brig was driven ashore at Cienfuegos, Cuba. She was on a voyage from Cienfuegos to Boston, Massachusetts, United States.
Helena	Norway	The brig struck the Runnel Stone off Gwennap Head, Cornwall, United Kingdom. Despite taking on water she was towed to Penzance, Cornwall, by a passing steamer. She was on a voyage from Bergen, Norway, to Cardiff, Glamorgan, Wales, with a cargo of ice.
Hermine	Denmark	The koff sank near Fredrikshavn. She was on a voyage from Aalborg to Hull, Yorkshire, UNited Kingdom.
Little Joe	United Kingdom	The ship sank off Pakefield, Suffolk. Her crew were rescued by the Kessingland Lifeboat. She was on a voyage from South Shields, County Durham to Lowestoft, Suffolk.
Old England	United Kingdom	The full-rigged ship was abandoned in the Atlantic Ocean. Her sixteen crew were rescued by Robert Burns (United Kingdom). Old England was on a voyage from Pensacola, Florida, United States to Queenstown, County Cork.
Olive Leaf	United Kingdom	The ship ran aground and was severely damaged at Whitstable, Kent.
Victor	Prussia	The ship was driven ashore on Ven Island, Sweden. She was on a voyage from Danzig to Hartlepool, County Durham, United Kingdom. She was refloated the next day and resumed her voyage.
Warburton	United Kingdom	The ship sprang a leak and ran aground at Baltimore, County Cork. She was on a voyage from Liverpool, Lancashire to Saint John's, Newfoundland, British North America.

== 19 April ==
List of shipwrecks: 19 April 1860
Ship	State	Description
Fisher	United Kingdom	The brigantine was lost on the coast of Greenland. Her five crew survived. She was on a voyage from Peterhead, Aberdeenshire to Greenland.
Hilda	United Kingdom	The ship was driven ashore on Swin Island, in the Belfast Lough. She was on a voyage from Belfast, County Antrim to Cardiff, Glamorgan.
Jane	United Kingdom	The brig ran aground on the Black Rock. She was on a voyage from South Shields, County Durham to Galway. She was refloated.
Sir Thomas Gresham	United Kingdom	The full-rigged ship sank in the Indian Ocean. Her eighteen crew survived; nine crew were rescued by Bellona (United Kingdom). Sir Thomas Gresham was on a voyage from Madras, India to "Gobalpore".
Zerce	Flag unknown	The brig was driven ashore in the Gudenå. She was on a voyage from Kiel, Prussia to an English port. She was refloated and taken in to Dybbøl, Denmark in a waterlogged condition.

== 20 April ==
List of shipwrecks: 20 April 1860
Ship	State	Description
Alexander	United Kingdom	The sloop sank and capsized at St. Ives, Cornwall. She was on a voyage from Penzance, Cornwall to Skerries, County Dublin.
Arethusa	United Kingdom	The ship was driven onto rocks at Bovisand, Devon. She was on a voyage from Belize City, British Honduras to Plymouth, Devon. She was refloated the next day and taken in to Plymouth.
Fortuna	United Kingdom	The sloop was driven ashore on Lindisfarne, Northumberland. She was on a voyage from Burntisland, Fife to Middlesbrough, Yorkshire.
Freeman	United Kingdom	The brig was abandoned in the Atlantic Ocean. Her eight crew survived. She was on a voyage from Cardiff, Glamorgan to Maranhão, Brazil.
Harvest	United Kingdom	The ship was sighted off the coast of Florida, United States whilst on a voyage from Mobile, Alabama, United States to Liverpool, Lancashire. No further trace, presumed foundered with the loss of all hands.
Mystery	United Kingdom	The schooner was driven ashore and wrecked at St. Ives. Her six crew survived. She was on a voyage from Swansea, Glamorgan to Smyrna, Ottoman Empire.
Trafalgar	United Kingdom	The barque sprang a leak due to shipworm and was abandoned in the Atlantic Ocean. Her 30 crew were rescued by two ships. She was on a voyage from Manila, Spanish East Indies to London.

== 21 April ==
List of shipwrecks: 21 April 1860
Ship	State	Description
Fatih Rehmen	India	The ship was driven ashore 8 nautical miles (15 km) north west of Aden. She was on a voyage from Calcutta to Jeddah, Habesh Eyalet. Her crew were rescued by the steamship Lady Canning (United Kingdom). Fatih Rehman was set afire to prevent capture by the Arabs.

== 22 April ==
List of shipwrecks: 22 April 1860
Ship	State	Description
Elizabeth	United Kingdom	The schooner was wrecked on the Port Lonsdale Reef.
Miriam	United Kingdom	The brig ran aground on the Newcombe Sand, in the North Sea off the coast of Suffolk. She was refloated.

== 23 April ==
List of shipwrecks: 23 April 1860
Ship	State	Description
Ann	United Kingdom	The collier, a brig, ran aground on the Insand, in the North Sea. She was refloated.
Florence Dombey	United Kingdom	The brig foundered 15 nautical miles (28 km) off Cape Santo Vito, Kingdom of the Two Sicilies. Her eight crew survived.
Neckar	Hamburg	The ship ran aground at Sunderland, England. She was on a voyage from Sunderland to Hong Kong. She was refloated and resumed her voyage, but consequently put in to Portsmouth, England in a leaky condition on 26 April.
Wave	(United Kingdom of Great Britain and Ireland) New South Wales	The schooner was wrecked near Nobbys Head. She was on a voyage from Sydney to Newcastle.

== 24 April ==
List of shipwrecks: 24 April 1860
Ship	State	Description
Emma Jane	United Kingdom	The smack ran aground and sank whilst giving assistance to Mary Ann (United Kingdom) at Felixtowe, Suffolk. Her crew survived.
Miriam	United Kingdom	The schooner was driven ashore and damaged at the Landguard Fort, Felixtowe. She was on a voyage from Portmadoc, Caernarfonshire to Ipswich, Suffolk. She was refloated and taken in to Harwich, Essex.
Tyrer	United Kingdom	The barque struck the Stag Rocks, in the English Channel off the coast of Cornwall and foundered. Her sixteen crew were rescued. She was on a voyage from Aux Cayes, Haiti to the Clyde.
Wonder	United Kingdom	The smack sank in the English Channel off the coast of Devon. Both crew were rescued by the Teignmouth Lifeboat.

== 25 April ==
List of shipwrecks: 25 April 1860
Ship	State	Description
Alexandre	France	The ship was driven ashore at Ouistreham, Calvados with the loss of three of her crew. She was on a voyage from an English port to Cherbourg, Seine-Inférieure.
Florence Dombey	United Kingdom	The ship foundered 15 nautical miles (28 km) off Cape Santo Vito, Kingdom of the Two Sicilies. Her crew were rescued.
Nyssia	Stettin	The brig capsized and sank off Start Point, Devon, United Kingdom with the loss of six of her nine crew. Survivors were rescued by the schooner Hermine (Denmark). Nyssia was on a voyage from Liverpool, Lancashire, United Kingdom to Stettin.
Ocean	United Kingdom	The ship was driven ashore in Isigny Bay. Her eight crew survived. She was on a voyage from Havre de Grâce, Seine-Inférieure, France to South Shields, County Durham. She subsequently broke up.
Remi	United Kingdom	The ship was lost off the coast of Korea. Her 26 crew survived.
Triton	United Kingdom	The ship was driven ashore at Cowes, Isle of Wight. She was on a voyage from Sunderland, County Durham to Cowes. She was refloated the next day.

== 26 April ==
List of shipwrecks: 26 April 1860
Ship	State	Description
Teviot	United Kingdom	The ship foundered off the north Kent coast.

== 27 April ==
List of shipwrecks: 27 April 1860
Ship	State	Description
Gustav Carl	Flag unknown	The ship was wrecked near Cape Palos, Spain. She was on a voyage from Alexandria, Egypt to a British port.
Margaretta	United Kingdom	The barque was wrecked at the mouth of the Tonalá River, Mexico. Her crew were rescued.
Sperwer	Flag unknown	The ship was wrecked at Adra, Spain. She was on a voyage from Málaga, Spain to Liverpool, Lancashire, United Kingdom.
Sunderland	United Kingdom	The ship ran aground on the Carrick Rock, off Port St. Mary, Isle of Man. She was refloated the next day.

== 28 April ==
List of shipwrecks: 28 April 1860
Ship	State	Description
Elizabeth	Norway	The brig sprang a leak and foundered off The Lizard, Cornwall, United Kingdom.
Forth	United Kingdom	The steamship ran aground at Burntisland, Fife. She was on a voyage from Granton, Lothian to Burntisland.
Solon	Grand Duchy of Oldenburg	The barque was wrecked near Shoalhaven, New South Wales with the loss of al crew member. She was on a voyage from Sydney, New South Wales to Geelong, Victoria.
William Bartlett	United Kingdom	The ship ran aground and sank at Banff, Aberdeenshire.
Zingari	United Kingdom	The steamship ran aground off Brielle, South Holland, Netherlands. She was on a voyage from Hartlepool, County Durham to Rotterdam, South Holland. She was refloated with the assistance of the tug Zeeland (Netherlands).

== 29 April ==
List of shipwrecks: 29 April 1860
Ship	State	Description
Don Quixhote	United Kingdom	The schooner struck rocks and sank. Her six crew survived. She was on a voyage from Hamburg to Galway.
Garland	United Kingdom	The full-rigged ship was driven ashore and wrecked near Campbeltown, Argyllshire. Her 28 crew survived. She was on a voyage from Liverpool, Lancashire to Quebec City, Province of Canada, British North America.
Mimic	Sweden	The brig sprang a leak and foundered in the Atlantic Ocean. All on board were rescued by Mary Rogerson (United Kingdom). Mimic was on a voyage from Bahia, Brazil to New York, United States.

== 30 April ==
List of shipwrecks: 30 April 1860
Ship	State	Description
Gulnare	United Kingdom	The full-rigged ship foundered in the Indian Ocean. All 33 people on board survived. She was on a voyage from Greenock, Renfrewshire to Kurrachee, India.
Matrona	United Kingdom	The ship foundered in the Atlantic Ocean. Her eleven crew were rescued by Hannah Smith (United States). Matrona was on a voyage from Havana, Cuba to Falmouth, Cornwall.
Roger Stewart	United Kingdom	The ship foundered in a hurricane in the Atlantic Ocean at 36°N 72°W during a voyage from Mobile, Alabama, United States to Liverpool, Lancashire, with a cargo of cotton. Only seven of her crew of 24 were rescued - one by Rockingham and six by Western Sea (both United States).
Vanguard	United Kingdom	The ship ran aground on the Blackwater Bank, in the Irish Sea off the coast of County Wexford. Her crew were rescued by the Arklow Lifeboat. She was on a voyage from Liverpool to New York, United States. She was refloated and put in to Kingstown, County Dublin in a leaky condition.

== Unknown date ==
List of shipwrecks: Unknown date in April 1860
Ship	State	Description
Annechina Gezina	Flag unknown	The ship was abandoned off Smyrna, Ottoman Empire. She was on a voyage from Smyrna to London, United Kingdom.
Aquila	United States	After her steam engine and boiler were removed ca. April 1860, the 133-foot (41 m), 59-gross register ton sternwheel paddle steamer was abandoned in the Fox River at DePere, Wisconsin. She subsequently deteriorated into a wreck in the vicinity of 44°27.095′N 088°03.980′W.
Betsy	United Kingdom	The schooner sank at Sunderland, County Durham.
Carston	United Kingdom	The ship was lost at Helsinki, Grand Duchy of Finland before 9 April.
Cordelière	French Navy	The Aventure-class corvette ran aground between Réunion and Zanzibar and was severely damaged.
D'Apres	France	The ship was wrecked on the coast of Madagascar before 7 April.
Emerald Isle	United Kingdom	The barque was abandoned in the Atlantic Ocean before 10 April. She was on a voyage from Saint John, New Brunswick, British North America to Cienfuegos, Cuba. She was discovered on 10 October and towed in to Yarmouth, Nova Scotia, British North America.
Eugene	France	The ship ran aground on the African Knoll. She was on a voyage from Marseille, Bouches-du-Rhône to Bathurst, Gambia.
Hermaphrodite	United Kingdom	The brig was abandoned in the Atlantic Ocean before 28 April.
Jantina	Netherlands	The galiot foundered in the Bay of Biscay before 19 April. She was on a voyage from Ayr, United Kingdom to Seville, Spain.
Jean Jacques d'Espana	France	The ship was wrecked on the Portuguese coast before 5 April. She was on a voyage from Cette, Hérault to Rotterdam, South Holland, Netherlands.
Kron Prins	Hamburg	The barque was driven ashore at the mouth of the Bassein River. She was on a voyage from Bassein, India to Falmouth, Cornwall, United Kingdom. She was refloated and put in to Singapore, Straits Settlements for repairs, arriving on 1 May.
Meunier	France	The ship was wrecked on the coast of Madagascar before 7 April.
Olga	Russia	The steamship was driven ashore on Gotland, Sweden. She was on a voyage from Reval to Leith, Lothian, United Kingdom. She was refloated and put in to Copenhagen, Denmark, where she arrived on 20 April.
Olivia	United Kingdom	The Mersey Flat struck the quayside and sank at Liverpool, Lancashire. She was refloated on 12 April.
Pleasant Bay	United States	The fishing schooner Left Gloucester, Massachusetts and was never seen again. Lost with all 9 crew.
Propitious	United Kingdom	The schooner was driven ashore at the Landguard Fort, Felixtowe, Suffolk. She was on a voyage from Sunderland to Brussels, West Flanders, Belgium. Propitious was refloated on 26 April.
Sebastopol	United Kingdom	The barque stranded on Horomaunga Beach in New Zealand's Chatham Islands and later broke up. She was en route from New Zealand to Valparaíso.
Shamrock	United Kingdom	The steamship was wrecked on the coast of China before 14 April.
St. Peter and St. Paul	United Kingdom	The ship ran aground on the Spykerplaat, off the coast of Zeeland, Netherlands. She was on a voyage from Liverpool to Antwerp, Belgium.
St. Vincent de Paul	(flag) France	The ship was wrecked on the coast of Madagascar before 7 April.
