= Tulip Radio =

Local community radio station covering the area of Spalding, Lincolnshire, England

England
- Broadcast area: South Lincolnshire
- Frequency: 107.5 MHz

Programming
- Format: Community

Ownership
- Owner: Tulip Radio Ltd

History
- First air date: 12 June 2009
- Last air date: 30 January 2017

Links
- Website: www.tulip-radio.co.uk

Tulip Radio was the local community radio station covering the area of Spalding, Lincolnshire, England. The name was linked to Spalding's heavy involvement with the horticulture industry. The town was famous for its tulips, and used to host an annual Flower Parade (originally the Tulip Parade) every May. The station had a float in the Spalding Flower Parade. Founded in 2001 as 'Tulip FM', and renaming in 2006 to Tulip Radio, in April 2008 the station was awarded an initial 5-year full-time community radio licence by Ofcom, the UK Media regulator. The station commenced full-time broadcasting on 12 June 2009. Amongst its most successful slots were the morning programme, hosted by Chris Carter,(once of Capital Radio, also Tulip Radio Managing Director)the gardening show at weekends and a Seventies Show with local broadcaster Adrian Lazell.

Tulip Radio was one of few radio stations nationally to offer media training to secondary students in local schools from its studios in The Crescent, originally funded by the leader+ scheme. Some of the students went on to present shows on the station. The station was regularly involved in community events such as the Annual Spalding Pumpkin Festival, the Flower Parade, Food Festival as well as Macmillan Cancer Support events & Springfields fireworks.

In 2007, the station also took on the job of finding the South Holland Flower Queen to be the leading lady of the Spalding Flower Parade. On 3 December 2011 Tulip Radio organised, on behalf of Spalding & Area Chamber of Commerce, the Christmas Lights Switch On.

As well as its own broadcasts, it joined the Blackfriars Arts Centre in helping to set up a radio station in Boston, Lincolnshire, formally known as Stump Radio which broadcasts during July on 87.7 FM. Stump eventually went on to become Endeavour FM and is still going.

== Aborted rescue and closure ==
It was announced on 12 December 2016 that Tulip Radio would cease broadcasting at 12 noon on 13 December 2016. During the final show, aired live from 9.00am to 12 noon, presenters Chris Carter and Jan Whitbourn were hand-delivered details of a rescue plan. This was mentioned on-air, with the possibility that all might not be over - they noted that the station was on a firm financial footing, it was just short of technical assistance and help with presentation of programmes.

The rescue plan came from Hereward Media (Peterborough) Limited, a local registered charity whose objectives are to advance the education and training of the inhabitants of Peterborough, the Fenlands and their surrounding areas in broadcasting and audio, video and media skills techniques. Spalding and South Holland are part of the charity's catchment area.

The station relaunched on 2 January 2017 at 7.00am, when a special show hosted by new technical and station directors revealed some of the new shows and approaches which would be adopted in the following months. The station began identifying itself as "Tulip - The Station You Can Really Call Your Own".

On 30 January 2017 Hereward Media announced that they were no longer working with Tulip Radio, citing irreconcilable differences and a catalogue of what was described as "unhelpful behaviour". A statement from Tulip Radio stated they were the ones who had made the decision to break the Memorandum of Agreement with Hereward Media, noting that it had been "terminated by the board". They also stated "broadcasting ceased and we shall be informing Ofcom that we intend to hand in our community radio licence".
