= Bovisand =

Coastline on the east side of Plymouth, England

Coordinates: 50°20′13.30″N 4°7′26.04″W

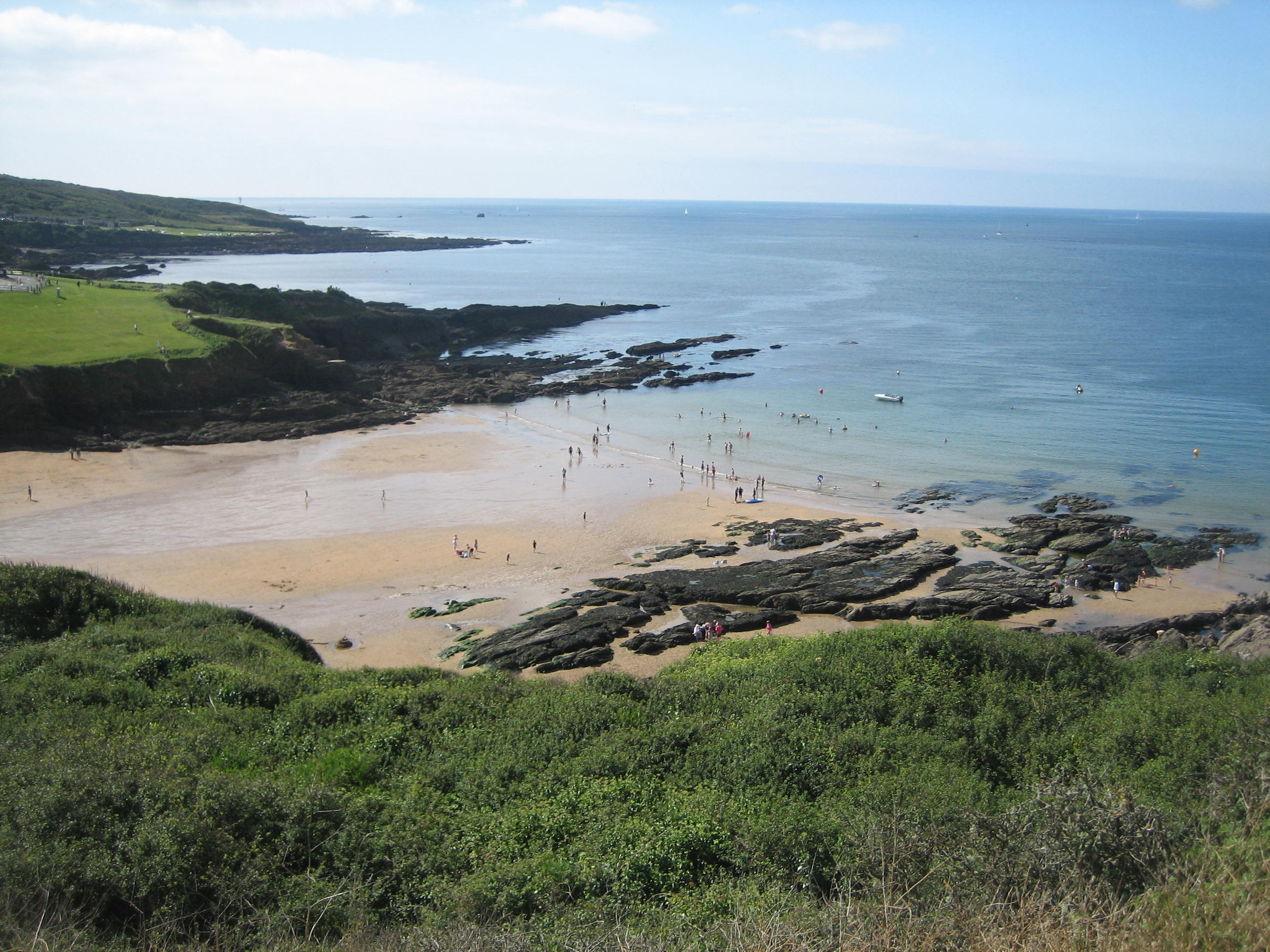
Bovisand Bay at low water

Bovisand is a natural coastline on the east side of Plymouth Sound in Devon, England. Despite the steep cliff paths and rocky surrounding, Bovisand features two beaches, a holiday park, privately owned bungalows and a diving centre at Fort Bovisand. The area, in the vicinity of Plymouth and Wembury, is used predominantly by locals, while tourists prefer the larger and better-known beaches elsewhere. It is often referred to as simply Bovi by locals. It lies just outside the boundaries of the city of Plymouth, within the district of South Hams, and is within the South Devon Area of Outstanding Natural Beauty.

There are two beaches at Bovisand, the first named Bovisand Bay is the northernmost separated from the southernmost, Crownhill Bay, by rocks and a grass bank, commonly known as "Grassy". Both beaches are accessible only by steps, and are served by a cafe and a small tourist shop, but have no lifeguards. Plymouth Council provide a bus direct to the bay from the city centre of Plymouth between May and August.

The view from Bovisands includes Plymouth Breakwater, Mount Edgcumbe in Cornwall just across Plymouth Sound, and the English Channel. Bovisand Pier (which was built between 1816 and 1824) and the harbour area are listed at grade II with Historic England.
