= Blackfriars Theatre and Arts Centre =

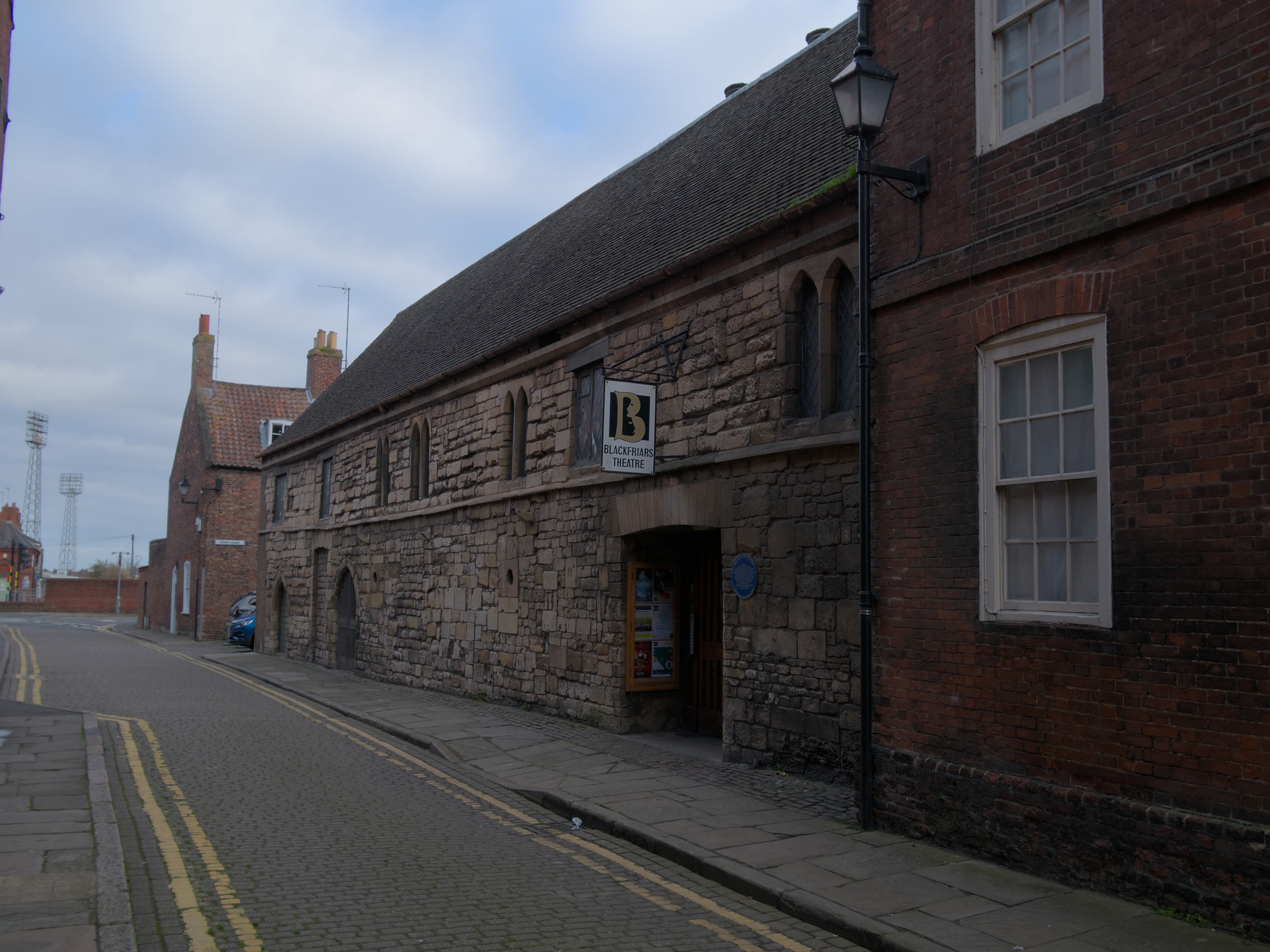
- The exterior from Broad Street

- Location within Lincolnshire
- 52.976171°N 0.022228°W
- Location: Spain Lane, Boston, Lincolnshire, England

Listed Building – Grade II*
- Designated: 27 March 1949
- Reference no.: 1389013

Blackfriars Theatre and Arts Centre is a theatre and community centre situated in Spain Lane, Boston, Lincolnshire, England. The building is a remaining part of a mediaeval friary.

== Building ==
Blackfriars Theatre and Arts Centree is Grade II* listed. The two-storey building was the refectory of a Dominican friary that was "heavily restored and altered" in 1963 when an eastern gable was rebuilt with casement windows added. The interior retains a 17th-century staircase, although not in its original position. Pevsner describes the building as a 90 feet (27 m) long "Friars Hall", running on an east to west axis with its upper floor previously the refectory. At the Suppression of the Monasteries material from the Friary was used to repair sea walls.

Blackfriars Friary was formed some time during the 13th century. The first written record is from 1288 when it was noted that the friary had been rebuilt after being destroyed by fire. In 1300 the friary housed a total of 29 friars. The surviving building was converted into a theatre in 1965.

Blackfriars is said to be haunted by a friar, who hides sharp objects left by theatregoers under the stage.

== Use ==
The centre's first professional director was appointed in 1980, but today it is completely run and managed by local volunteers with the help of a full-time theatre technician. It comprises a theatre with a 230-seat auditorium, a foyer gallery, a revue bar, and an art studio.

In former days the arts centre provided art classes, including night classes in still life, life drawing, screen printing, needlework and photography. It included various residences and numerous outreach workers throughout the 1980s and 1990s.

Groups which use the arts centre currently include the Boston Playgoers, BOS Musical Theatre Group, and Cutwater Theatre Group. There is also a very active Theatre Academy for children from 4 to 19, and a number of other organisations meet here including U3A, Ballet schools, and Lithuanian Community Groups. Rooms are available for hire.

The building hosts performances, workshops, classes and other activities, and has a rolling art exhibition, generally featuring local artists, which is changed monthly.

Stump Radio was established at the centre with help from Spalding's Tulip Radio, and broadcast during July and August 2006, and in 2007. The station is now Endeavour FM, presenting news, music and community events through local presenters.
