= Wrangle, Lincolnshire =

Village in the Boston Borough of Lincolnshire, England

Coordinates: 53.038736°N 0.126474°E

Wrangle
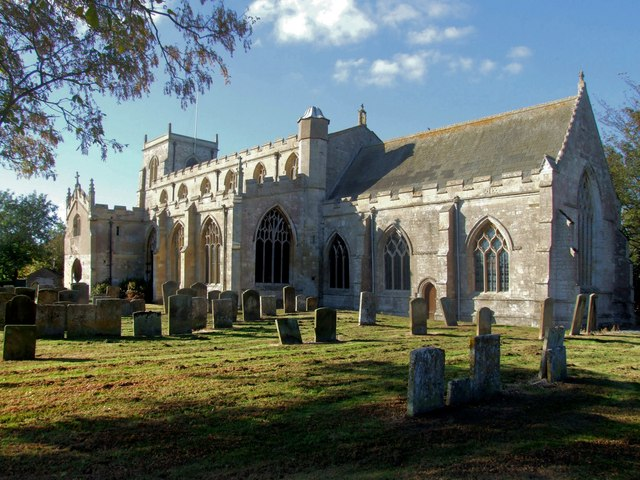
- Church of St Mary and St Nicholas, Wrangle

- Location within Lincolnshire
- Population: 1,397 (2011)
- OS grid reference: TF426511
  - London: 110 mi (180 km) SSW
- District: Boston
- Shire county: Lincolnshire
- Region: East Midlands
- Country: England
- Sovereign state: United Kingdom
- Post town: Boston
- Postcode district: PE22
- Police: Lincolnshire
- Fire: Lincolnshire
- Ambulance: East Midlands
- UK Parliament: Boston and Skegness

Wrangle is a village in the Boston Borough of Lincolnshire, England. It is situated approximately 9 miles (14 km) north-east from the town of Boston. The population of Wrangle civil parish in 2001 was 1,265, increasing to 1,397 at the 2011 census.

Wrangle is one of eighteen parishes which, together with Boston, form the Borough of Boston. The local government has been arranged in this way since the reorganisation of 1 April 1974, which resulted from the Local Government Act 1972. This parish forms part of the Old Leake and Wrangle electoral ward.

Hitherto, the parish had formed part of Boston Rural District, in the Parts of Holland. Holland was one of the three divisions (formally known as parts) of the traditional county of Lincolnshire. Since the Local Government Act 1888, Holland had been in most respects, a county in itself.

== History ==
The name Wrangle reputedly derives from the Scandinavian Vrangr, meaning "bent" or "crooked" – a reference to a stream long since gone.

The village lies on western side of The Wash, on the broad bank of marine silt left by the great tidal creeks which formed, predominantly during the Bronze Age, about 2,500 years ago. To seaward, the marsh has accreted over the centuries, a process hastened by artificial enclosure for pasture. As this progressed, the tide no longer flowed off the marsh twice a day to keep Wrangle Haven open. With its silting, the main feature of medieval Wrangle was lost. It had been the third-biggest harbour on this coast, after Swineshead (Bicker Haven) and Boston (The Haven).

Wrangle was mentioned in the Domesday Book of 1086, when it consisted of seven households.

At Kings Hill are earthwork remains of a medieval Motte-and-bailey castle, believed to be associated with a manorial estate established during the 11th and 12th centuries. In the early 17th century this passed to King James I and the site became known as King’s Hill. The site is a scheduled monument.

Wrangle Hall was the seat of the Reade family, who resided there from the 14th century until the late 17th century. A large part of the house was taken down about 1806, and the remainder was modernised about 25 years later. Traditionally there was a chapel here, the remains of which survived in a field opposite the hall in the 18th century. This is probably the St Peter's Chapel, Wrangle, mentioned in 1342. The present Wrangle Hall is modern, built on the site of the previous building which was demolished around 1935.

Wrangle tower windmill is a Grade II-listed building which was built about 1825 of red brick. It was worked by wind until the 1930s. An electric hammer mill and mixer were in use in 1977.

== Church ==
The parish church is dedicated to Saint Mary and Saint Nicholas, and is built in the Perpendicular style of the 12th century. In the period between 1154 and 1189, the church and much land came under the governance of Waltham Abbey in Essex, which supplied its priests. It is recorded that in the glass of the east window was an inscription in Latin which translated means "Tomas de Wyversty, Abbot of Waltham had me made". The building later fell into disrepair, but was restored in the 14th century. The chancel was restored again between 1875 and 1878 by Ewan Christian. A plaque in the church commemorates some American airmen who died when their plane crashed on Wrangle Common in 1944 during the Second World War. It is a Grade I listed building.

Population of Wrangle Civil Parish
Year	1801	1811	1821	1831	1841	1851	1881	1891	1901	1911	1921	1931	1941	1961	2001
Population	732	843	995	1,030	1,132	1,196	1,165	1,084	1,028	1,080	1,142	1,203	1,316	1,311	1,265
