= List of elections in 2007 =

The following elections occurred in the year 2007.

- Electoral calendar 2007
- Elections in 2007
- 2007 United Nations Security Council election

== Africa ==
- 52nd National Conference of the African National Congress
- 2007 Algerian legislative election
- 2007 Beninese parliamentary election
- 2007 Burkinabé parliamentary election
- 2007 Cameroonian parliamentary election
- 2007 Democratic Republic of the Congo gubernatorial elections
- 2007 Democratic Republic of the Congo Senate election
- 2007 Republic of the Congo parliamentary election
- 2007 Egyptian Shura Council election
- 2007 Egyptian constitutional referendum
- 2007 Ethiopian presidential election
- 2007 Gambian parliamentary election
- 2007 Kenyan general election
- 2007 Lebanese by-elections
- 2007 Lesotho general election
- 2007 Malagasy parliamentary election
- 2007 Malagasy constitutional referendum
- 2007 Malian parliamentary election
- 2007 Malian presidential election
- 2007 Mauritanian Senate election
- 2007 Mauritanian presidential election
- 2007 Moroccan parliamentary election
- 2007 Nigerian general election
- 2007 Senegalese Senate election
- 2007 Senegalese parliamentary election
- 2007 Senegalese presidential election
- 2007 Seychellois parliamentary election
- 2007 Sierra Leonean general election
- 2007 Togolese parliamentary election

== Asia ==
- 2007 Abkhazian local elections
- 2007 Abkhazian parliamentary election
- 2007 Armenian parliamentary election
- 2007–2008 Bhutanese National Council election
- 2007 East Timorese presidential election
- 2007 East Timorese parliamentary election
- 2007 Hong Kong Chief Executive election
- 2007 Hong Kong Island by-election
- 2007 Israeli presidential election
- Jordanian parliamentary election results, 2007
- 2007 Jordanian parliamentary election
- 2007 Kazakhstani legislative election
- 2007 Kuomintang chairmanship election
- 2007 Kyrgyzstani constitutional referendum
- 2007 Kyrgyzstani parliamentary election
- 2007 Labor Party (Israel) leadership election
- 2007 Lebanese by-elections
- 2007 Maldivian constitutional referendum
- 2007 Nagorno-Karabakh presidential election
- 2007 North Korean local elections
- 2007 Omani parliamentary election
- 2007 Pakistani presidential election
- 2007 Qatari municipal elections
- 2007 South Korean presidential election
- 2007 Syrian parliamentary election
- 2007 Syrian presidential election
- 2007 Thai general election
- 2007 Thai constitutional referendum
- 2007 Turkmenistan presidential election
- 2007 Uzbekistani presidential election
- 2007 Vietnamese parliamentary election
- 2007 Vietnamese presidential election

=== India ===
- 2007 Goa Legislative Assembly election
- 2007 Gujarat Legislative Assembly election
- 2007 Himachal Pradesh Legislative Assembly election
- 2007 Indian presidential election
- 2007 Indian vice presidential election
- 2007 Punjab Legislative Assembly election
- 2007 Uttar Pradesh Legislative Assembly election
- 2007 Uttarakhand Legislative Assembly election

=== Japan ===
- 2007 Chuo mayoral election
- 2007 Fukagawa mayoral by-election
- 2007 Fukuoka gubernatorial election
- 2007 Higashiōsaka city assembly election
- 2007 Inagi local election
- 2007 Japanese House of Councillors election
- 2007 Kameoka mayoral election
- 2007 Liberal Democratic Party (Japan) leadership election
- 2007 Meguro local election
- 2007 Miyazaki gubernatorial by-election
- 2007 Miyota mayoral election
- 2007 Mukō city assembly election
- 2007 Ōta local election
- 2007 Japanese House of Councillors election
- 2007 Rikuzentakata mayoral election
- 2007 Saitama gubernatorial election
- 2007 Shinagawa city assembly election
- 2007 Shinjuku local election
- 2007 Tokyo gubernatorial election
- 2007 Warabi city assembly election
- 2007 Warabi mayoral election

=== Malaysia ===
- 2007 Batu Talam by-election
- 2007 Ijok by-election
- 2007 Machap by-election

=== Philippines ===
- 2007 Philippine House of Representatives elections
- 2007 Philippine Senate election
- 2007 Philippine barangay and Sangguniang Kabataan elections
- 2007 Philippine general election

=== Russia ===
- 2007 Chechen constitutional referendum
- 2007 Russian legislative election
- 2007 Volgograd mayoral election

=== Turkey ===
- 2007 Turkish general election
- 2007 Turkish presidential election
- 2007 Turkish constitutional referendum

== Europe ==
- 2007 Abkhazian parliamentary election
- 2007 Åland legislative election
- 2007 Albanian presidential election
- 2007 Albanian local elections
- 2007 Andorran local elections
- 2007 Armenian parliamentary election
- 2007 Belgian general election
- 2007 Bulgarian local elections
- 2007 Croatian parliamentary election
- 2007 Danish parliamentary election
- 2007 Estonian parliamentary election
- European Parliament election, 2007 (Romania)
- 2007 European Parliament election
- European Parliament election, 2007 (Bulgaria)
- 2007 Finnish parliamentary election
- 2007 Gibraltar general election
- 2007 Greek legislative election
- 2007 Icelandic parliamentary election
- 2007 Irish general election
- 2007 Jersey constable election
- 2007 Jordanian local elections
- 2007 Kosovan parliamentary election
- 2007 Kosovan local elections
- 2007 Latvian presidential election
- 2007 Liechtenstein local elections
- 2007 Maltese local council elections
- 2007 Moldovan local elections
- 2007 Nagorno-Karabakh presidential election
- 2007 Norwegian local elections
- 2007 Panhellenic Socialist Movement leadership election
- 2007 Polish parliamentary election
- 2007 Republika Srpska presidential election
- 2007 Romanian voting system referendum
- 2007 Romanian presidential impeachment referendum
- 2006–07 Serbian local elections
- 2007 Serbian parliamentary election
- 2007 Slovenian presidential election
- 2007 Turkish general election
- 2007 Turkish presidential election
- 2007 Turkish constitutional referendum
- 2007 Ukrainian parliamentary election

=== Austria ===
- 2007 Burgenland local elections
- 2007 Krems local election

=== European Parliament ===
- 2007 European Parliament election
- European Parliament election, 2007 (Bulgaria)
- European Parliament election, 2007 (Romania)

=== France ===
- 2007 French presidential election
- 2007 French legislative election
- 2007 Saint Barthélemy Territorial Council election
- 2007 Saint Martin Territorial Council election

=== Germany ===
- 2007 Bremen state election

=== Italy ===
- 2008 Abruzzo regional election
- 2008 Friuli-Venezia Giulia regional election
- Italian Senate election in Lombardy, 2008
- 2008 Italian general election
- Italian general election, 2008 (Aosta Valley)
- Italian general election, 2008 (Friuli-Venezia Giulia)
- Italian general election, 2008 (Piedmont)
- Italian general election, 2008 (Sardinia)
- Italian general election, 2008 (Sicily)
- Italian general election, 2008 (Trentino-Alto Adige/Südtirol)
- Italian general election, 2008 (Veneto)
- 2008 Sicilian regional election
- 2008 Trentino-Alto Adige/Südtirol provincial elections
- 2008 Valdostan regional election
- 2007 Democratic Party (Italy) leadership election

=== Netherlands ===
- 2007 Dutch Senate election
- 2007 Dutch provincial elections

=== Russia ===
- 2007 Chechen constitutional referendum
- 2007 Russian legislative election
- 2007 Volgograd mayoral election

=== Spain ===
- Elections to the Aragonese Corts, 2007
- Elections to the Corts Valencianes, 2007
- 2007 Spanish local elections
- 2007 Spanish regional elections

=== Switzerland ===
- 2007 Swiss federal election
- 2007 Swiss Federal Council election
- 2007 Grand Council of Vaud election

=== Turkey ===
- 2007 Turkish general election
- 2007 Turkish presidential election
- 2007 Turkish constitutional referendum

=== United Kingdom ===
- 2007 Ealing Southall by-election
- 2007 Inverclyde Council election
- 2007 Labour Party deputy leadership election
- 2007 Labour Party (UK) leadership election
- 2007 Liberal Democrats leadership election
- 2007 United Kingdom local elections
- 2007 Northern Ireland Assembly election
- 2007 Scottish Parliament election
- 2007 Sedgefield by-election
- 2007 Timeline for the Labour Party (UK) leadership elections

==== United Kingdom local ====
- 2007 United Kingdom local elections
- United Kingdom local elections, 2007/Metropolitan boroughs
- United Kingdom local elections, 2007/Unitary boroughs
- United Kingdom local elections, 2007/District councils
- 2007 Scottish local elections
- 2003 Scottish local elections

===== English local =====
- 2007 Allerdale Council election
- 2007 Alnwick Council election
- 2007 Amber Valley Council election
- 2007 Arun Council election
- 2007 Ashfield Council election
- 2007 Ashford Council election
- 2007 Aylesbury Vale Council election
- 2007 Babergh Council election
- 2007 Barrow-in-Furness Council election
- 2007 Bassetlaw Council election
- 2007 Blackburn with Darwen Council election
- 2007 Blackpool Council election
- 2007 Bolton Council election
- 2007 Boston Borough Council election
- 2007 Brentwood Council election
- 2007 Brighton and Hove City Council election
- 2007 Broxbourne Council election
- 2007 Burnley Council election
- 2007 Calderdale Council election
- 2007 Cherwell Council election
- 2007 Chichester Council election
- 2007 Chorley Council election
- 2007 Corby Borough Council election
- 2007 Coventry Council election
- 2007 Craven Council election
- 2007 Dacorum Council election
- 2007 Dartford Council election
- 2007 Daventry Council election
- 2007 Derby Council election
- 2007 Eastleigh Council election
- 2007 Ellesmere Port and Neston Council election
- 2007 Epping Forest Council election
- 2007 Fylde Council election
- 2007 Halton Council election
- 2007 Harlow Council election
- 2007 Hart Council election
- 2007 Hull Council election
- 2007 Hyndburn Council election
- 2007 Ipswich Borough Council election
- 2007 Kettering Borough Council election
- 2007 Knowsley Council election
- 2007 Liverpool Council election
- 2007 Macclesfield Council election
- 2007 Manchester Council election
- 2007 Mole Valley Council election
- 2007 Newcastle-under-Lyme Council election
- 2007 North Lincolnshire Council election
- 2007 North Tyneside Council election
- 2007 Northampton Council election
- 2007 Penwith Council election
- 2007 Portsmouth Council election
- 2007 Preston Council election
- 2007 Purbeck Council election
- 2007 Redditch Council election
- 2007 Rochdale Council election
- 2007 Rochford Council election
- 2007 Rossendale Council election
- 2007 Runnymede Council election
- 2007 Rushmoor Council election
- 2007 Ryedale Council election
- 2007 Salford Council election
- 2007 Scarborough Council election
- 2007 Sedgefield Council election
- 2007 Sheffield Council election
- 2007 Shepway Council election
- 2007 Slough Council election
- 2007 South Lakeland Council election
- 2007 South Ribble Council election
- 2007 Southend-on-Sea Council election
- 2007 St Albans Council election
- 2007 St Helens Council election
- 2007 Stevenage Council election
- 2007 Stockport Council election
- 2007 Stratford-on-Avon Council election
- 2007 Surrey Heath Council election
- 2007 Swindon Council election
- 2007 Tameside Council election
- 2007 Tamworth Council election
- 2007 Tandridge Council election
- 2007 Three Rivers Council election
- 2007 Thurrock Council election
- 2007 Trafford Council election
- 2007 Tunbridge Wells Council election
- 2007 Tynedale Council election
- 2007 Vale of White Horse Council election
- 2007 Wakefield Council election
- 2007 Warwick Council election
- 2007 Watford Council election
- 2007 Welwyn Hatfield Council election
- 2007 West Lancashire Council election
- 2007 West Lindsey Council election
- 2007 West Wiltshire Council election
- 2007 Weymouth and Portland Council election
- 2007 Winchester Council election
- 2007 Windsor and Maidenhead Council election
- 2007 Wirral Council election
- 2007 Woking Council election
- 2007 Wokingham Council election
- 2007 Wolverhampton Council election
- 2007 Worcester Council election
- 2007 Worthing Council election
- 2007 Wyre Forest Council election
- 2007 York Council election

===== Scottish local =====
- 2007 Scottish local elections
- 2003 Scottish local elections
- 2007 Aberdeen City Council election
- 2007 Aberdeenshire Council election
- 2007 Angus Council election
- 2007 Argyll and Bute Council election
- 2007 City of Edinburgh Council election
- 2007 Clackmannanshire Council election
- 2007 Comhairle nan Eilean Siar election
- 2007 Dumfries and Galloway Council election
- 2007 Dundee City Council election
- 2007 East Ayrshire Council election
- 2007 East Dunbartonshire Council election
- 2007 East Lothian Council election
- 2007 East Renfrewshire Council election
- 2007 Falkirk Council election
- 2007 Fife Council election
- 2007 Glasgow City Council election
- 2007 Midlothian Council election
- 2007 North Ayrshire Council election
- 2007 North Lanarkshire Council election
- 2007 Orkney Islands Council election
- 2007 Perth and Kinross Council election
- 2007 Renfrewshire Council election
- 2007 Scottish Borders Council election
- 2007 Shetland Islands Council election
- 2007 South Ayrshire Council election
- 2007 South Lanarkshire Council election
- 2007 Stirling Council election
- 2007 Highland Council election
- 2007 West Dunbartonshire Council election
- 2007 West Lothian Council election

==== National Assembly for Wales ====
- 2007 National Assembly for Wales election
- One Wales

== North America ==
- 2007 Costa Rican Dominican Republic – Central America Free Trade Agreement referendum
- 2007 Guatemalan general election

=== Canada ===
- Canadian electoral calendar, 2007
- 2007 Alberta provincial by-elections
- 2007 Belfast-Murray River provincial by-election
- 2007 Canadian federal by-elections
- 2007 Charlevoix provincial by-election
- 2007 Cole Harbour-Eastern Passage provincial by-election
- Commission scolaire de la Région-de-Sherbrooke election, 2007
- Commission scolaire du Val-des-Cerfs election, 2007
- 2007 Green Party of British Columbia leadership election
- 2007 Manitoba general election
- 2007 Moncton East provincial by-election
- 2007 New Brunswick New Democratic Party leadership election
- 2007 Newfoundland and Labrador general election
- 2007 Newfoundland and Labrador provincial by-elections
- 2007 Northwest Territories general election
- 2007 Nova Scotia Liberal Party leadership election
- 2007 Ontario electoral reform referendum
- Ontario electoral reform referendum, 2007 detailed results
- 2007 Ontario provincial by-elections
- 2007 Parti Québécois leadership election
- 2007 Prince Edward Island general election
- 2007 Quebec general election
- 2007 Saint John, New Brunswick ward plebiscite
- 2007 Saskatchewan general election

==== Alberta municipal ====
- 2007 Alberta municipal elections
- 2007 Calgary municipal election
- 2007 Edmonton municipal election
- 2007 Grande Prairie municipal election
- 2007 Lethbridge municipal election
- 2007 Medicine Hat municipal election
- 2007 Red Deer municipal election
- 2007 Slave Lake municipal election
- 2007 Spruce Grove municipal election
- 2007 Wood Buffalo municipal election

==== Ontario general ====
- 2007 Ontario general election
- Green Party of Ontario candidates, 2007 Ontario provincial election
- Ontario Liberal Party candidates, 2007 Ontario provincial election
- Ontario New Democratic Party candidates, 2007 Ontario provincial election
- Ontario general election, 2007 (results)
- Progressive Conservative Party of Ontario candidates, 2007 Ontario provincial election

=== Caribbean ===
- 2007 Bahamian general election
- 2007 Bermudan general election
- 2007 British Virgin Islands general election
- 2007 Costa Rican Dominican Republic – Central America Free Trade Agreement referendum
- 2007 Cuban local elections
- 2007 Jamaican general election
- 2007 Nevis 9 by-election
- 2007 Saint Martin Territorial Council election
- 2007 Trinidad and Tobago general election
- 2007 Turks and Caicos Islands general election
- 2007 United States Virgin Islands Constitutional Convention election

==== United States Virgin Islands ====
- 2007 United States Virgin Islands Constitutional Convention election

=== Mexico ===
- 2007 Mexican elections
- 2007 Baja California state election
- Broad Progressive Front
- 2007 Yucatán state election

=== United States ===
- 2007 United States elections
- 2007 Kentucky state elections
- 2007 Louisiana state elections
- 2007 Mississippi general election
- 2007 Northern Mariana Islands general election
- 2007 Oregon's statewide elections
- 2007 Pennsylvania state elections
- 2007 Virginia state elections

==== United States House of Representatives ====
- 2007 United States House of Representatives elections
- 2007 California's 37th congressional district special election
- 2007 Georgia's 10th congressional district special election
- 2007 Massachusetts's 5th congressional district special election
- 2007 Ohio's 5th congressional district special election
- 2007 Virginia's 1st congressional district special election

==== United States Senate ====
- 2007 Georgia's 24th state senate district special election

==== United States lieutenant gubernatorial ====
- 2007 Louisiana lieutenant gubernatorial election

==== United States gubernatorial ====
- 2007 Kentucky gubernatorial election
- 2007 Louisiana gubernatorial election
- 2007 Mississippi gubernatorial election
- 2007 United States gubernatorial elections

==== United States mayoral ====
- 2007 Akron mayoral election
- 2007 Arlington mayoral election
- 2007 Baltimore mayoral election
- 2007 Birmingham, Alabama mayoral election
- 2007 Boise mayoral election
- 2007 Cary, North Carolina, mayoral election
- 2007 Charlotte mayoral election
- 2007 Chicago mayoral election
- 2007 Colorado Springs mayoral election
- 2007 Columbus, Ohio mayoral election
- 2007 Dallas mayoral election
- 2007 Denver mayoral election
- 2007 Des Moines mayoral election
- 2007 Durham mayoral election
- 2007 Evansville, Indiana, mayoral election
- 2007 Fayetteville, North Carolina, mayoral election
- 2007 Flint mayoral election
- 2007 Fort Wayne mayoral election
- 2007 Fort Worth mayoral election
- 2007 Grand Rapids mayoral election
- 2007 Green Bay mayoral election
- 2007 Hartford mayoral election
- 2007 Houston mayoral election
- 2007 Indianapolis mayoral election
- 2007 Jacksonville mayoral election
- Juneau, Alaska, regular election, 2007
- Juneau, Alaska, special election, 2007
- 2007 Kansas City mayoral election
- 2007 Knoxville mayoral election
- 2007 Las Vegas mayoral election
- 2007 Lincoln, Nebraska mayoral election
- 2007 Madison mayoral election
- 2007 Manchester, New Hampshire, mayoral election
- 2007 Memphis mayoral election
- 2007 Montgomery mayoral election
- 2007 Nashville mayoral election
- 2007 Philadelphia mayoral election
- 2007 Phoenix mayoral election
- 2007 Pittsburgh mayoral special election
- 2007 Raleigh mayoral election
- 2007 San Antonio mayoral election
- 2007 Salt Lake City mayoral election
- 2007 San Francisco mayoral election
- November 2007 San Francisco general elections
- 2007 Springfield, Massachusetts mayoral election
- 2007 South Bend mayoral election
- 2007 Tampa mayoral election
- 2007 Tucson mayoral election
- 2007 Wichita mayoral election
- 2007 Worcester, Massachusetts mayoral election

==== Constitutional ====
- 2007 Texas constitutional amendment election
- 2007 United States Virgin Islands Constitutional Convention election

==== Washington (U.S. state) ====
- Washington Initiative 957 (2007)
- Washington Initiative 960 (2007)
- Washington Referendum 67 (2007)

=== United States Virgin Islands ===
- 2007 United States Virgin Islands Constitutional Convention election

== Oceania ==
- 2007 Kiribati parliamentary election
- 2007 Kiribati presidential election
- 2007 Marshall Islands general election
- 2007 Micronesian parliamentary election
- 2007 Micronesian presidential election
- 2007 Nauruan parliamentary election
- 2007 Nauruan presidential election
- 2007 New Zealand local elections
- 2007 Northern Mariana Islands general election
- 2007 Papua New Guinean general election
- 2007 Pitcairn Islands general election
- 2007 Samoan o le Ao o le Malo election
- 2007 Titikaveka by-election
- 2007 Tokelauan self-determination referendum
- 2007 Vaimauga West by-election
- 2007 Wallis and Futuna Territorial Assembly election

=== Australia ===
==== Federal ====
- 2007 Australian federal election
  - 2007 House of Representatives results for the Australian federal election
  - 2007 Senate results for the Australian federal election
  - Mackerras federal election pendulum, 2006
  - Post-election pendulum for the 2007 Australian federal election
  - Liberal Party of Australia leadership spill, 2007
  - National Party of Australia leadership spill, 2007

==== New South Wales ====
- 2007 New South Wales state election
  - New South Wales state election campaign, 2007

==== Northern Territory ====
- 2007 Greatorex by-election

==== Queensland ====
- 2007 Brisbane Central state by-election
- 2007 Queensland Local Government Area amalgamation plebiscites

==== Victoria ====
- 2007 Albert Park state by-election
- 2007 Williamstown state by-election

==== Western Australia ====
- 2007 Peel state by-election

=== New Zealand ===
- 2007 Dunedin mayoral election
- 2007 New Zealand local elections
- 2007 Wellington City mayoral election

=== Northern Mariana Islands ===
- 2007 Northern Mariana Islands general election

== South America ==
- 2007 Argentine general election
- 2007 Colombian regional and municipal elections
- 2007 Ecuadorian Constituent Assembly election
- 2007 Ecuadorian Constituent Assembly referendum
- 2007 Venezuelan constitutional referendum
