= 2007 Assembly election =

Seventeen Assembly elections took place in 2007:

== Ecuador ==
- 2007 Ecuadorian Constituent Assembly election
- 2007 Ecuadorian Constituent Assembly referendum

== India ==
- 2007 Goa Legislative Assembly election
- 2007 Gujarat Legislative Assembly election
- 2007 Himachal Pradesh Legislative Assembly election
- 2007 Indian presidential election
- 2007 Punjab Legislative Assembly election
- 2007 Uttar Pradesh Legislative Assembly election
- 2007 Uttarakhand Legislative Assembly election

== Japan ==
- 2007 Higashiōsaka city assembly election
- 2007 Mukō city assembly election
- 2007 Shinagawa city assembly election
- 2007 Warabi city assembly election

== Northern Ireland ==
- 2007 Northern Ireland Assembly election

== Wales ==
- 2007 National Assembly for Wales election

== Wallis and Futuna ==
- 2007 Wallis and Futuna Territorial Assembly election

== See also ==
- List of elections in 2007
