= Results of the 2007 United Kingdom local elections (unitary authorities) =

== Unitary authorities ==
=== Whole council ===
In 25 English unitary authorities the whole council was up for election.

Council	Previous control	Result	Details
Bath and North East Somerset	No overall control	No overall control hold	Details
Blackpool	Labour	Conservative gain	Details
Bournemouth	Liberal Democrats	Conservative gain	Details
Bracknell Forest	Conservative	Conservative hold	Details
Brighton & Hove	No overall control	No overall control hold	Details
Darlington	Labour	Labour hold	Details
East Riding of Yorkshire	No overall control	Conservative gain	Details
Herefordshire	No overall control	Conservative gain	Details
Leicester	No overall control	Labour gain	Details
Luton	No overall control	Labour gain	Details
Medway	Conservative	Conservative hold	Details
Middlesbrough	Labour	Labour hold	Details
North Lincolnshire	Conservative	Labour gain	Details
North Somerset	No overall control	Conservative gain	Details
Nottingham	Labour	Labour hold	Details
Poole	Conservative	Conservative hold	Details
Redcar and Cleveland	No overall control	No overall control hold	Details
Rutland	Conservative	Conservative hold	Details
South Gloucestershire	No overall control	No overall control hold	Details
Stockton-on-Tees	No overall control	No overall control hold	Details
Telford and Wrekin	No overall control	No overall control hold	Details
Torbay	Liberal Democrats	Conservative gain	Details
West Berkshire	Conservative	Conservative hold	Details
Windsor and Maidenhead	Liberal Democrats	Conservative gain	Details
York	Liberal Democrats	No overall control gain	Details

=== Third of council ===
In 20 English unitary authorities one third of the council was up for election.

Council	Previous control	Result	Details
Blackburn with Darwen	Labour	No overall control gain	Details
Bristol	No overall control	No overall control hold	Details
Derby	No overall control	No overall control hold	Details
Halton	Labour	Labour hold	Details
Hartlepool	Labour	Labour hold	Details
Kingston upon Hull	No overall control	Liberal Democrats gain	Details
Milton Keynes	No overall control	No overall control hold	Details
North East Lincolnshire	No overall control	No overall control hold	Details
Peterborough	Conservative	Conservative hold	Details
Plymouth	No overall control	Conservative gain	Details
Portsmouth	No overall control	No overall control hold	Details
Reading	Labour	Labour hold	Details
Slough	No overall control	No overall control hold	Details
Southampton	No overall control	No overall control hold	Details
Southend-on-Sea	Conservative	Conservative hold	Details
Stoke-on-Trent	No overall control	No overall control hold	Details
Swindon	Conservative	Conservative hold	Details
Thurrock	Conservative	No overall control	Details
Warrington	No overall control	No overall control hold	Details
Wokingham	Conservative	Conservative hold	Details
