= 2007 San Antonio mayoral election =

- May 12, 2007
- Turnout: 10.16% ▼

Candidate	Phil Hardberger	Patrick McCurdy	Eiginio Rodriguez
Popular vote	53,553	5,611	4,189
Percentage	77.34%	8.10%	6.05%
Mayor before election
Phil Hardberger
Elected mayor
Phil Hardberger

On May 12, 2007, the city of San Antonio, Texas, held an election to choose who would serve as Mayor of San Antonio for a 2-year term to expire in 2009. Incumbent mayor Phil Hardberger won over 77 percent of the vote, securing re-election to a second and final 2-year term. (Term limits were relaxed from two 2-year terms to four 2-year terms starting with the 2009 election; however, such relief does not apply to those who have already been elected to an office in which the two-term limit applies.) Under Texas law, all municipal elections are nonpartisan.

== Background ==
Phil Hardberger, who was first elected mayor in the 2005 mayoral election, decided to pursue election to a second and final term. His opponent in the runoff, Julian Castro opted not to seek a rematch against Hardberger in the 2007 mayoral election, thus leaving Hardberger to face six minor candidates in the election (Castro would instead seek, and successfully gain election to the mayoralty of San Antonio two years later).

=== Declared ===
- R. G. Griffing
- Phil Hardberger, incumbent Mayor of San Antonio
- Michael "Commander" Idrogo
- Patrick McCurdy
- Julie Iris Oldham
- Eiginio Rodriguez
- Rhett R. Smith

=== Declined ===
- Julian Castro, former District 7 councilman and 2005 mayoral candidate

== Results ==
On May 12, 2007, the election for Mayor was held. Phil Hardberger secured re-election with over 77% of the vote, thus negating the need of a runoff election (which would have been required if no candidate got 50%+1 of all votes cast).

San Antonio Mayor, 2007 Regular election, May 12, 2007
Candidate		Votes	%	±
✓	Phil Hardberger	53,553	77.34%	+25.87%
	Patrick McCurdy	5,611	8.10%	
	Eiginio Rodriguez	4,189	6.05%	
	Julie Iris Oldham	2,097	3.03%	+2.22%
	R. G. Griffing	1,524	2.20%	
	Michael Idrogo	1,347	1.94%	+1.70%
	Rhett R. Smith	919	1.33%	+1.08%
Turnout		69,240	8.11%*	

* Vote percentage include all of Bexar County with a total of 17,493 (2.06%) either voting in another municipal election, casting a spoiled vote or casting no ballot for San Antonio mayor.
