= 2007 Jersey constable election =

The 2007 Constable elections in Jersey were the last before a revised election system was introduced to the island in 2008, resulting in some elected Constables serving terms of less than 15 months. Constable elections are normally for a period of 3 years. From 2008, all Constables would be elected on a single day, and all terms would be cut short to allow for this. Thus all elections in 2007 were for a period until that date.

== Terms expiring in 2007 ==
- St. Peter Tom du Feu 02.07.07
- Grouville Dan Murphy 23.07.07
- St. Saviour Philip Ozouf 13.08.07
- St. Clement Derek Gray 17.12.07
- St. Helier Alan Simon Crowcroft 17.12.07

== Results ==
Parish	Date	Candidate	Votes	%	Notes
Grouville	26 July 2007	Dan Murphy	1,040	61.87	Elected
Grouville	26 July 2007	Peter Le Maistre	641	38.13	
St. Clement	9 January 2008	Derek Gray	—	—	Elected unopposed
St. Helier	9 January 2008	Simon Crowcroft	2,317	90.16	Elected
St. Helier	9 January 2008	Alvin Aaron	253	9.84	
St. Peter	14 June 2007	Tom Du Feu	—	—	Elected unopposed
St. Saviour	25 July 2007	Peter Hanning	—	—	Elected unopposed
