= 2007 Tampa mayoral election =

- March 6, 2007
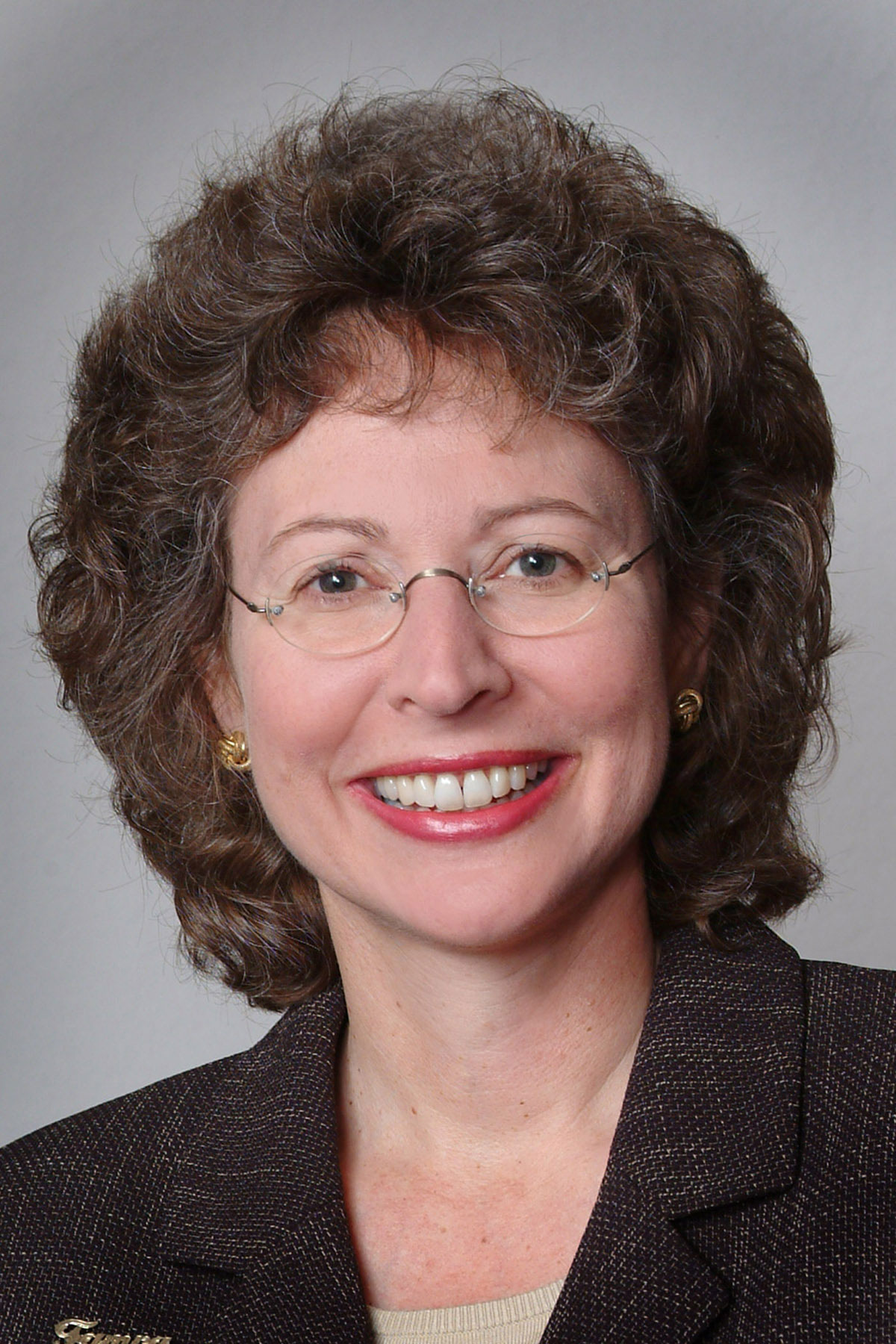

Candidate	Pam Iorio	Marion Serious Lewis	Aria Ray Green
Party	Nonpartisan	Nonpartisan	Nonpartisan
Popular vote	21,885	3,365	2,281
Percentage	79.49%	12.22%	8.29%
Mayor before election
Pam Iorio
Nonpartisan
Elected mayor
Pam Iorio
Nonpartisan

The 2007 Tampa mayoral election took place on March 6, 2007. Incumbent Mayor Pam Iorio, who was first elected in 2003, ran for re-election. Despite speculation that former Mayor Dick A. Greco or wealthy businessman John H. Sykes might challenge Iorio, neither ended up challenging her. Instead, Iorio faced police captain Marion Serious Lewis and former Fire Department Chief Aria Ray Green, whom Iorio fired. Iorio ultimately won re-election in a landslide, winning 79 percent of the vote to Lewis's 12 percent and Green's 8 percent.

== Candidates ==
- Aria Ray Green, former chief of the Tampa Fire Rescue Department
- Pam Iorio, incumbent mayor
- Marion Serious Lewis, Tampa Police Department captain

== Results ==
2007 Tampa mayoral election
Party	Candidate	Votes	%
Nonpartisan	Pam Iorio (inc.)	21,885	79.49%
Nonpartisan	Marion Serious Lewis	3,365	12.22%
Nonpartisan	Aria Ray Green	2,281	8.29%
Total votes		27,531	100.00%
