= Fifth Constitutional Convention of the U.S. Virgin Islands =

Political meeting in 2009

The Fifth Constitutional Convention of the U.S. Virgin Islands proposed a constitution for the United States Virgin Islands in May 2009.

The Virgin Islands government is organized under the provisions of the Revised Organic Act of 1954 and the Treaty of the Danish West Indies of 1916. On October 21, 1976, Congress passed Pub. L. 94–584 (subsequently amended by Pub. L. 96-597, title V, Sec. 501, Dec. 24, 1980) authorizing the people of the United States Virgin Islands to organize a government pursuant to a constitution, which would be automatically approved if Congress did not act within 60 days. Constitutional conventions were elected, but did not adopt a constitution, in 1964, 1971, 1977, and 1980. An Act was passed by the 25th Legislature of the Virgin Islands calling for a fifth constitutional convention, and 30 delegates to the convention were elected in the 2007 United States Virgin Islands Constitutional Convention election.

The convention passed a proposed constitution in May 2009, and President of the Fifth Constitutional Convention Gerard Luz James submitted it to Virgin Islands Governor John P. de Jongh on June 1, 2009. According to James, the proposed constitution would not affect the Virgin Islands' status as a Non-Self-Governing Territory as determined by the United Nations, but would only organize existing internal governance arrangements.

After initially declining to forward the proposal to the "administering power", the President of the United States, Governor de Jongh sent the draft to President Barack Obama in December 2009. The proposed constitution was submitted by the President to the United States Congress on March 1, 2010. According to Pub. L. 94–584, Congress could approve, amend, or modify the constitution by joint resolution, or the constitution would be automatically approved if Congress did not act within 60 days. Instead, Congress passed Pub. L. 111–194 (text) (PDF) (124 Stat. 1309) which provided that Congress would send the Constitution back to the convention and urge the convention to reconvene.

The objections of de Jongh, the U.S. Department of Justice, and the U.S. Congress included the failure of the proposed constitution to expressly recognize United States sovereignty; its granting of legal advantages to people of local ancestry or birth; and imprecise wording of parts of the bill of rights.

On September 11, 2012, Governor de Jongh signed Act No. 7386 convening the Fifth Revision Convention. It was to convene within the month of October 2012 and was to be composed of the 30 delegates of the Fifth Constitutional Convention and a legal team. It convened but failed to make a decision by the October 31 2012 deadline.
