= 2007 Inagi local election =

Local elecion in Japan

Inagi, Tokyo held an election for the city assembly on April 15, 2007.

== Results ==
Party	Votes	%	Seats
New Komeito Party	6,283		4
Democratic Party of Japan	5,723		3
Liberal Democratic Party	3,957		3
Japanese Communist Party	3,488		3
Inagi Network of Living	1,460		1
Independents	10,265		8
Total		100	22
Registered voters/turnout		53.43	–
Source:Senkyo
