= 2007 Jordanian local elections =

- July 31, 2007

94 mayors 970 members of local councils
- Turnout: 50%

On July 31, 2007, Jordan held mayoral and council elections in 94 municipalities. As in past elections, the Municipality of Greater Amman (MOGA) was exempt from the full election; only half of the 68-member council was elected, while the other half of the MOGA council, along with the mayor, was appointed by the King of Jordan.

The elections were the first to take place under new legislation that guarantees at least twenty percent of elected positions to women candidates and lowers the age of eligible voters from 19 to 18.

== Results ==
Ajlun Governorate

Municipality	Mayor
Greater Ajlun	Mahmdouh Al Zghool
Kafrangeh	Fawzat Fraihat
Junaid	Fakhri Ahmed Al-Momani
Shafa	Mustafa Al Ghazoo
Oyoon	Mohammed Bani Said

Amman Governorate

Municipality	Mayor
Amman	Omar Al-Maani Appointed
Um Al-Rasas	Yasin Ogail Al-Hgaish
Aamrieh	Darwish Mohammed AL-Satel

Aqaba Governorate

Municipality	Mayor
Kwairah	Mohammed hameed Al-Jaraymeh
Hawd Al Deesah	Sa'ed Al-Hwaitat
Kraikra wa Feenan	Khalil AL-Amareen
Wadi Arabah	Dmaijaan Swailem Al-Saidyyen

Balqa Governorate

Municipality	Mayor
Greater Salt	Salameh Al-Hyari
Ain AL Basha	Jamal Abdulla Al Fa'ori
Al Aarda	Eid Saleem Al-Manaseer
Dair Alla	Khalifeh Slaiman Dayyat
M'aadi	Ibrahim Musa Abu-Dyyeh
Central Shuna	Mohammed Erfaifan Al Edwan
Fuhais	Geries Faris Al Swais
Mahis	Abdul Men'em Irshaidat
Swaimah	ohammed Sulaiman Al J'araat

Irbid Governorate

Municipality	Mayor
Greater Irbid	Abdul Ra'ouf Attal
West Irbid	Yasin Al-Shunnak
Ramtha	Hussein Abu Al-Sheeh
Sahil Houran	Bassam Al-Darabseh
Khalid Bin Al Walid	Rafe' Khaleef Al-A'klaat
Yarmouk	Ahmed Salih Al-Zo'bi
Kaffarat	Ahmed E'baidat
Sho'la	Said Khalaf Khaza'leh
Saroo	Abdulla Mikdadi
Mo'az Bin Jabal	Ali Hussein Al Dalki
Tabaket Fahil	Mahmoud Ali Al Aas
Sharhabil Bin Hasna	Ahmed Khamis Ibdah
Mazaar	Hussein Mohammed AL Jarrah
Taibah	Mohammed Musa Al-Kar'an
Wastyyeh	Imad Al-Azzam
Deir Abi Said	Mohammed Sarhan Bani Irshaid
Rabyet El Koora	Walid Nawafleh
Barkash	Mohammed Slaiman Khatatbeh

Jerash Governorate

Municipality	Mayor
Greater Jerash	Redwan Salim Al-Sha'er
Me'raad	Ahmed Awad Al Zo'bi
Bab Amman	Mahmoud Al-Tahir Al-Khawaldeh
Nasim	Mohammed Mahmoud Al-Sharari
Burma	Egab Al-Salamat

Kerak Governorate

Municipality	Mayor
Greater Kerak	Ahmed Al-Dhmoor
Sheehan	Munir Al-Majali
Talal	Nayel Al-omar
Abdulla Bin Rawaha	Omar Al-Bdairat
Mu'ta wa Mazaar	Mohammed Abdulla Al-Sarayreh
Hazman	Mohammed AL-Rawashdeh
Southern Ghour	Jamil Al-Nawaysheh
Gatraneh	Faisal Hamid Al-Asfar
Mo'ab	Jamal Al-Tarawneh
Sad Al-Sultani	Mohammed Al-Hajaya

Ma'an Governorate

Municipality	Mayor
Greater Ma'an	Khalaf Al Khattab
Husaynyyeh	Hayel Mohammed Al Jazi
Jaffer	Mohammed Mlaihan Al Nawaseer
AAyel	Ali Jad'an Naimat
Sharah	Khalaf Awad Abu Nwair
Ash'ari	Salim Nassar
Shawbak	Abdul Rahaman Khalid Al Torah

Madaba Governorate

Municipality	Mayor
Greater Madaba	Aarif Mahmoud Abu-Rajooh
Zaiban	Khalil Al Hawawsheh
Lub wa Mlaiha	Hamad Abdul Karim Al-Shbailat
Bani Hamidah	Falah Shahaeh Al Ga'aydeh

Mafraq Governorate

Municipality	Mayor
Greater Mafraq	Abdulla Al Arkan
Manshiet Bani Hasan	Ghazi Shdaifat
Erehaab	Khalid Akho Ershaideh
Bal'ama	Abdulla Hatmal Al-Shar'a
Za-atari wa Al Manshieh	Faraj Al Fawa'ereh
Housha	Khalaf Jazi Al Barri
Baslieh	Ali Mnaizel Al Hmoud
Sarhan	Abdul Karim Ghassab Al Sarhan
Khaldieh	Salim AL-Rumi
Prince Hussein Bin Abdulla	Mikdad AL-Khawaldeh
Umm Al Jimaal	Salih Falah Al-Masa'eed
Sabha Wa Dafyaneh	Omar Subuh Shamrookh Al Delmaz
Umm al Gtain Wa Al Mkaifteh	Mohammed Al Sharfaat
Dair Al Kahif	Mohammed Awad Al Sbyyeh
Salhieh Wa Nayfeh	Abdulla Ragaa' Al Akra'
Bani Hashim	Mohammed Fadil Al Sharfaat
Safawi	Mohammed Fardous Al Sharfaat
Rwaished	Falah Al Ghayyath

Tafilah Governorate

Municipality	Mayor
Greater Tafilah	Khalid Musa Al-Hnaifat
Al Harith Bin Omayr	Mohammed Al-Rfo'o
Al Hasa	Rana Khalaf Al Hajaya
Al Qadisyyah	Shukri AL Khawaldeh

Zarqa Governorate

Municipality	Mayor
Greater Zarqa	Musa Al Ghwairy
Russaifa	Mousa Ali Assa'ed
Baireen	Ahmed Bakheet Al Ghwairy
Hashimyah	Oglah AL Zyood
Dhlail	Nidal Karim AL Awadat
Hallabat	Khalaf Al Othman
Azraq	Kamal Ata
