= 2007 United States Virgin Islands Constitutional Convention election =

The 2007 United States Virgin Islands Constitutional Convention election was an election to the Fifth Constitutional Convention of the U.S. Virgin Islands in the United States Virgin Islands on 12 June 2007. The convention was the fifth attempt to give the United States territory its own constitution; previous constitutional conventions had been elected (without a constitution being adopted) in 1964, 1971, 1977 and 1980.

There were 30 delegates elected — 13 from Saint Croix, 11 from Saint Thomas, and 2 from Saint John. Two delegates from Saint Thomas/Saint John and two from Saint Croix were elected by voters on a territory-wide basis.

== Results ==
Delegate at-large - St. Thomas/St. John
Candidate	Votes	%
Arturo Watlington Jr.	4,170	28.53
Craig W. Barshinger	2,790	19.09
Nandi Sekou	2,468	16.89
Rita A. Brady-Bermudez	1,767	12.09
William Belardo	1,623	11.10
George W. Phillips	1,268	8.68
Andre T. Dorsey	518	3.54
Write in	12	0.08
Total	14,616	100.00

Delegate at-large - St. Croix
Candidate	Votes	%
Adelbert Bryan	4,950	29.90
Gerard Luz James	3,643	22.01
Virdin C. Brown	2,678	16.18
Rupert W. Ross Jr.	2,298	13.88
Jay Wiltshire	718	4.34
Fred A. Esannason	662	4.00
Verna Christian Garcia	645	3.90
Elizabeth Pichardo	488	2.95
Edward L. Browne	466	2.82
Write in	5	0.03
Total	16,553	100.00

District delegates - St. Thomas/St. John
Candidate	Votes	%
Myron D. Jackson	2,625	5.76
Charles W. Turnbull	2,544	5.58
Lawrence Sewer	2,159	4.74
Lois Hassell-Habtes	2,143	4.70
Clement Magras	2,073	4.55
Stedman Hodge Jr.	1,790	3.93
Thomas K. Moore	1,748	3.83
Francis Jackson	1,710	3.75
Wilma Marsh Monsanto	1,537	3.37
Mario A. Francis	1,528	3.35
Lisa Williams	1,397	3.06
Lorna A. C. Thomas	1,375	3.02
Rochelle M. Corneiro	1,367	3.00
Tom Bolt	1,321	2.90
Mark Hodge	1,301	2.85
Carolyn Hermon-Percell	1,282	2.81
Whitman T. Browne	1,252	2.75
Merle Fenton	1,196	2.62
James Bernier Jr.	1,103	2.42
Kathleen Mackay	1,085	2.38
Dwane A. Callwood	1,001	2.20
Derek Gabriel	989	2.17
Lorraine Moorehead	914	2.01
Aimery P. Caron	864	1.90
Ray K. Joseph	834	1.83
Sean L. Krigger	823	1.81
Michelle Shulterbrandt	788	1.73
T. Jubilani Rees	736	1.61
Alma Francis-Heyliger	655	1.44
Sunil Mohanani	542	1.19
Julia Baptiste	519	1.14
Carol Annette Callwood	518	1.14
Lynelle I. Niles	498	1.09
Jacquel Dawson	460	1.01
Jerome J. Blyden	434	0.95
Hector A. Squiabro	408	0.90
Hiram Rasool Abiff	393	0.86
Donald "Smokey" Charles	367	0.81
Robert Kunkel	334	0.73
Brian McLernan	272	0.60
Abdul Liburd	263	0.58
Alena E. Richards	244	0.54
Georgina Anne Murphy	82	0.18
Harold Ulrich	69	0.15
Write in	38	0.08
Total	45,581	100.00

District delegates - St. Thomas/St. John (Residents of St. John)
Candidate	Votes	%
Alecia M. Wells	2,248	33.16
Elsie V. Thomas-Trotman	1,941	28.63
Harry A. Daniel	1,798	26.52
Paul E. Devine	525	7.74
Bruce Ian Fielding	266	3.92
Write in	1	0.01
Total	6,779	100.00

District delegates - St. Croix
Candidate	Votes	%
Eugene A. Petersen	2,927	5.44
Michael Thurland	2,371	4.40
Claire L. Roker	2,146	3.99
Rena Brodhurst	1,946	3.62
Doug Capdeville	1,873	3.48
Arnold M. Golden	1,847	3.43
Richard Schrader Jr.	1,824	3.39
Gerard Marlow Emanuel	1,633	3.03
Mary L. Moorhead	1,584	2.94
Violet Anne Golden	1,543	2.87
Kendall "Seigo" Petersen	1,528	2.84
Robert Schuster	1,523	2.83
Douglas Brady	1,485	2.76
Evelyn Messer James	1,449	2.69
Lee J. Rohn	1,408	2.62
Lilliana Belardo de O'Neal	1,393	2.59
Terrance T. Joseph	1,367	2.54
Miguel A. Camacho Sr.	1,268	2.36
Rael Sackey	1,237	2.30
Percival Edwards	1,222	2.27
Carl F. Christopher	1,192	2.21
Ophelia "Nemmy" Jackson	1,115	2.07
Carol Burke	1,100	2.04
Horrace W. Graham Jr.	1,099	2.04
Gloria Canegata Waterman	1,082	2.01
Daniel Coughlin	1,039	1.93
Cecil R. Benjamin	918	1.71
Dorothy E. Bolling	825	1.53
H. Hannibal O'Bryan	820	1.52
Oceana James	788	1.46
Sandra Bastian-Carty	693	1.29
C. "Dr. Chen" Kahina	686	1.27
Robert Hoffman	685	1.27
Nicholas A. Castruccio	673	1.25
Herbert Schoenbohm	645	1.20
Verdel L. Petersen	596	1.11
Pamela Lynn Colon	575	1.07
Harold E. Smith	564	1.05
Edwin A. Thomas	522	0.97
Thomas Hannah	507	0.94
Steve Nisky	493	0.92
James T. Bland Jr.	465	0.86
Martin P. Merrick	422	0.78
Omar B. U. Henry	403	0.75
Charles E. Tilson	360	0.67
Joseph Peter Stropole	319	0.59
Merrily Burch	289	0.54
Natalie M. Hollins	265	0.49
Jason P. Walker	234	0.43
Lerlene E. Arrindell	214	0.40
Richard Martin Boehm	199	0.37
John B. Stout	197	0.37
Jonathan Buckney	134	0.25
Owen T. Marsh	126	0.23
Write in	11	0.02
Total	53,829	100.00
Total votes	5,937	–
Registered voters/turnout	26,059	22.78

== Process ==
The delegates had until May 31, 2009, to deliberate on a constitution proposal. The convention did not start work in July 2007, as planned, due to delays over legal challenges to the poll; it finally convened on 29 October 2007.

It was then to be (after review periods by the Governor of the United States Virgin Islands, the President of the United States and the United States Congress) be put to a referendum, possibly in November 2010. However, Congress referred the proposed constitution back to the Virgin Islands for further deliberations. The convention was then reconvened, with a deadline to act before the end of October, 2012.

This deadline passed, so for the time being the people of the Virgin Islands will continue to be governed by the Revised Organic Act of 1954, an enactment of the United States Congress. It is a federal law, meaning the people of the Virgin Islands cannot amend it themselves.
