= 2007 Denver mayoral election =

- May 1, 2007
- Turnout: 41.92%
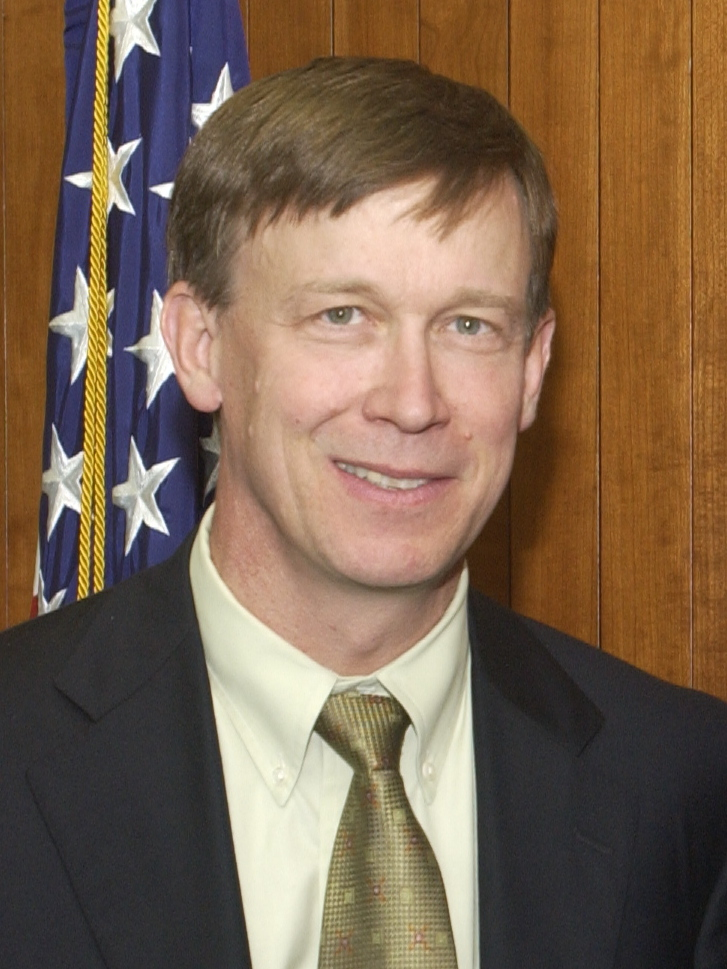

Candidate	John Hickenlooper	Danny F. Lopez
Party	Nonpartisan	Nonpartisan
Popular vote	68,568	10,053
Percentage	86.30%	12.65%
Mayor before election
John Hickenlooper
Democratic
Elected mayor
John Hickenlooper
Democratic

The 2007 Denver mayoral election was held on May 1, 2007. Since John Hickenlooper obtained an absolute majority of the vote in the initial round of voting, no runoff was held.

== Results ==
2007 Denver mayoral election
Candidates	Votes	%
John Hickenlooper (incumbent)	68,568	86.30
Danny F. Lopez	10,053	12.65
Write-ins	834	1.05
Total	79,455	100
