= 2007 Vaud Grand Council election =

The 2007 election to the Grand Council was held in the canton of Vaud, Switzerland, on 11 March 2007. All 150 members of the Grand Council were elected for four-year terms, a reduction of 30 from the size of the previous legislature.

The Social Democratic Party secured the largest number of seats once again; although it lost seven seats, its percent share of the seats remained constant. Despite the reduction in the size of the legislature, the populist Swiss People's Party and Green Party both managed to gain seats.

The main losers were the two classical liberal parties, the Free Democrats and Liberals, who lost 15 and 11 seats respectively, reducing them from 42% of seats between them to 33%. The far left À gauche toute! lost most of its seats. The Christian Democrats, Green Liberals, and Federal Democratic Union formed a heterogeneous centrist alliance called 'Alliance of the Centre', which won seven seats.

== Results ==
Summary of the 11 March 2007 Vaud Grand Council election results
Party	Ideology	Vote %	Seats	Seats ±
Social Democratic Party	Social democracy	23.88	39	–7
Free Democratic Party	Classical liberalism	19.05	29	–15
Swiss People's Party	National conservatism	14.44	26	+4
Green Party	Green politics	16.94	24	+1
Liberal Party	Classical liberalism	14.09	20	–11
Alliance of the Centre^{1}	Centrism	4.72	7	+5^{1}
À gauche toute!	Socialism	6.87	5	–7
Total (turnout 39.66%)		100.00	150	–30
^{1} Consisted of PDC, Green Liberals, UDF, and Riviera Libre. Result compared to Christian Democratic list in 2007.
Source: Canton of Vaud
