= 2007 Rochford District Council election =

2007 UK local government election

Results of the 2007 Rochford District Council election

Elections to Rochford Council were held on 3 May 2007. One third of the council was up for election and the Conservative party stayed in overall control of the council.

After the election, the composition of the council was:

Party	Seats	±
Conservative	32	-2
Liberal Democrat	5	+1
Rochford Residents	1	0
Independent	1	+1

== Election result ==
Rochford local election result 2007
Party	Seats	Gains	Losses	Net gain/loss	Seats %	Votes %	Votes	+/−
Conservative	9	0	2	-2	69.2	49.2	4,793	-6.1%
Liberal Democrats	3	1	0	+1	23.1	22.8	2,221	+5.0%
Independent	1	1	0	+1	7.7	2.8	271	+2.8%
Labour	0	0	0	0	0	11.3	1,097	-4.5%
Green	0	0	0	0	0	5.9	572	+0.9%
BNP	0	0	0	0	0	4.8	472	+4.8%
English Democrat	0	0	0	0	0	3.2	313	+3.2%

4 Conservative candidates were unopposed.

== Ward results ==
=== Ashingdon and Canewdon ===
Ashingdon and Canewdon
Party	Candidate	Votes	%	±%
Conservative	Tracy Capon	659	64.6	+8.1
Green	Andrew Vaughan	361	35.4	+5.0
Majority		298	29.2	+3.1
Turnout		1,020	29.4	−7.6
Conservative hold		Swing		

=== Barling and Sutton ===
Barling and Sutton
Party	Candidate	Votes	%	±%
Independent	Robin Allen	271	54.7	+54.7
Conservative	Richard Amner	224	45.3	−19.8
Majority		47	9.4	
Turnout		495	35.2	+11.7
Independent gain from Conservative		Swing		

=== Downhall and Rawreth ===
Downhall and Rawreth
Party	Candidate	Votes	%	±%
Liberal Democrats	Ronald Oatham	857	73.6	+0.3
Conservative	Roland Adams	308	26.4	−0.3
Majority		549	47.2	+0.6
Turnout		1,165	34.0	−3.6
Liberal Democrats hold		Swing		

=== Foulness and Great Wakering ===
Foulness and Great Wakering
Party	Candidate	Votes	%	±%
Conservative	Colin Seagers	uncontested		
Conservative hold		Swing		

=== Grange ===
Grange
Party	Candidate	Votes	%	±%
Liberal Democrats	June Lumley	722	74.3	+8.0
Conservative	David Withers	250	25.7	−8.0
Majority		472	48.6	+16.0
Turnout		972	35.5	−1.9
Liberal Democrats hold		Swing		

=== Hawkwell North ===
Hawkwell North
Party	Candidate	Votes	%	±%
Conservative	Lucy Cox	uncontested		
Conservative hold		Swing		

=== Hawkwell South ===
Hawkwell South
Party	Candidate	Votes	%	±%
Conservative	Phil Capon	uncontested		
Conservative hold		Swing		

=== Hawkwell West ===
Hawkwell West
Party	Candidate	Votes	%	±%
Conservative	Derrick Stansby	603	64.1	+30.1
Labour	Myra Weir	337	35.9	+14.6
Majority		266	28.2	
Turnout		940	30.2	−9.3
Conservative hold		Swing		

=== Hockley Central ===
Hockley Central
Party	Candidate	Votes	%	±%
Conservative	Keith Hudson	uncontested		
Conservative hold		Swing		

=== Hullbride ===
Hullbridge
Party	Candidate	Votes	%	±%
Conservative	Lesley Butcher	928	49.5	−9.0
BNP	Robert Green	472	25.2	+25.2
Labour	Angelina Marriott	318	17.0	−5.8
Green	Robin Hume	155	8.3	−10.4
Majority		456	24.3	−11.4
Turnout		1,873	35.2	+3.7
Conservative hold		Swing		

=== Lodge ===
Lodge
Party	Candidate	Votes	%	±%
Conservative	Terry Livings	455	43.8	−21.1
English Democrat	Paula Hayter	313	30.1	+30.1
Liberal Democrats	Patricia Putt	216	20.8	+20.8
Green	Neil Kirsh	56	5.4	−29.7
Majority		142	13.7	−16.1
Turnout		1,040	33.1	−1.9
Conservative hold		Swing		

=== Rochford ===
Rochford
Party	Candidate	Votes	%	±%
Conservative	Susan Harper	970	68.7	+15.8
Labour	David Lench	442	31.3	−15.8
Majority		528	37.4	+31.6
Turnout		1,412	26.9	−5.1
Conservative hold		Swing		

=== Sweyne Park ===
Sweyne Park
Party	Candidate	Votes	%	±%
Liberal Democrats	Jackie Dillnutt	426	51.8	
Conservative	Peter Savill	396	48.2	
Majority		30	3.6	
Turnout		822	25.1	
Liberal Democrats gain from Conservative		Swing		
