= 2007 Medicine Hat municipal election =

The 2007 Medicine Hat municipal election was held Monday, October 15, 2007. Since 1968, provincial legislation has required every municipality to hold triennial elections. The citizens of Medicine Hat elected one mayor, eight aldermen (all at large), the five Medicine Hat School District No. 76 trustees (at large), and four of the Medicine Hat Catholic Separate Regional Division No. 20's five trustees (four from Ward Medicine Hat). The incumbent mayor Garth Valley, did not run. There was a voter turnout of 47.5%, and an average 5.8 aldermen per ballot.

== Results ==
Bold indicates elected, and incumbents are italicized.

=== Mayor ===
Mayor
Candidate	Votes	%
**Normand Boucher**	**10,551**	**55.6%**
Ted Grimm	4,471	23.6%
Bill Cocks	2,112	11.1%
Stewart Boyd	1,580	8.3%
Dave R. B. MacLean	268	1.4%

=== Aldermen ===
Aldermen
Candidate	Votes	%	Candidate	Votes	%
**Julie Friesen**	**9,680**	**8.78%**	Leslie Martin	4,174	3.79%
**John Hamill**	**9,134**	**8.29%**	Desmond (Des) Grant	3,502	3.18%
**Ty Schneider**	**8,379**	**7.60%**	Scott Cowan	3,152	2.86%
**Graham Kelly**	**8,102**	**7.35%**	Tyler Hoffman	2,788	2.53%
**Ted Clugston**	**7,681**	**6.97%**	Jim Ogston	2,632	2.39%
**Robert C. Dumanowski**	**7,592**	**6.89%**	Marco Luciano Franchetto	1,800	1.63%
**Jeremy O. Thompson**	**7,229**	**6.56%**	Stu Holland	1,456	1.32%
**Jamie White**	**6,141**	**5.57%**	Carl Pattison	1,448	1.31%
Les Pearson	5,964	5.41%	Fred McFall	1,392	1.26%
Brian Varga	5,834	5.29%	Robert Tudor	846	0.77%
Betty Staples	5,540	5.03%	Richard Frederick Burtt	638	0.58%
Harv Speers	5,121	4.65%			

=== Public School Trustees ===
Medicine Hat School District No. 76
Candidate	Votes	%
**Gitta Hashizume**	**7,108**	**21.1%**
**Roy Wilson**	**5,904**	**17.5%**
**Deborah Forbes**	**5,702**	**16.9%**
**Terry Riley**	**4,503**	**13.3%**
**Greg Bender**	**4,006**	**11.9%**
Tom Rooke	3,654	10.8%
Lilas Litousky	2,862	8.5%

=== Separate School Trustees ===
Medicine Hat Catholic Separate Regional Division No. 20
Ward Medicine Hat			Ward Bow Island		
Candidate	Votes	%	Candidate	Votes	%
**Stan Aberle**	**3,449**	**20.87%**	**Kelly Van Ham**	**Acclaimed**	
**Jodi Churla**	**2,180**	**13.19%**			
**Peter Grad**	**1,935**	**11.71%**			
**Ken Arthur**	**1,638**	**9.91%**			
Mike Tivadar	1,351	8.17%			
Howard Snodgrass	1,282	7.76%			
Immanuel Moritz	1,100	6.66%			
Mario Rossetto	973	5.89%			
Anita Ross	726	4.39%			
Robyn Watz	711	4.30%			
Rob McCrea	651	3.94%			
Maurice A. (Butch) Ganzer	532	3.21%			
