= 2007 Weymouth and Portland Borough Council election =

2007 UK local government election

Results of the 2007 Weymouth and Portland Borough Council election

Elections to Weymouth and Portland Borough Council were held on 3 May 2007. One third of the council was up for election and the council stayed under no overall control.

After the election, the composition of the council was:

- Conservative 14
- Liberal Democrat 11
- Labour 6
- Independent 5

== Election result ==
Weymouth and Portland local election result 2007
Party	Seats	Gains	Losses	Net gain/loss	Seats %	Votes %	Votes	+/−
Conservative	7	3	1	+2	58.3	38.7	6,327	+5.4%
Liberal Democrats	3	1	2	-1	25.0	28.1	4,590	-2.6%
Labour	1	1	2	-1	8.3	24.9	4,070	+0.5%
Independent	1	0	0	0	8.3	4.7	769	-5.2%
Green	0	0	0	0	0	2.1	341	+0.4%
UKIP	0	0	0	0	0	1.4	232	+1.4%
Monster Raving Loony	0	0	0	0	0	0.2	26	+0.2%

== Ward results ==
Melcombe Regis
Party	Candidate	Votes	%	±%
Liberal Democrats	Joy Stanley	683	50.9	+9.1
Conservative	Christopher Griffin	384	28.6	−9.1
Labour	Maria Blackwood	168	12.5	−0.8
Green	Paul McIntosh	108	8.0	+0.8
Majority		299	22.3	+18.2
Turnout		1,343	28.4	−4.4
Liberal Democrats hold		Swing		

Preston
Party	Candidate	Votes	%	±%
Conservative	Peter Chapman	1,199	51.2	+2.7
Liberal Democrats	David Mannings	1,013	43.3	−1.4
Labour	Maureen Drake	130	5.6	−1.3
Majority		186	7.9	+4.1
Turnout		2,342	54.4	−1.0
Conservative gain from Liberal Democrats		Swing		

Radipole
Party	Candidate	Votes	%	±%
Liberal Democrats	Bill White	847	67.4	
Conservative	Peter Fry	216	17.2	
UKIP	Alvin Hopper	106	8.4	
Labour	Stewart Pearson	88	7.0	
Majority		631	50.2	
Turnout		1,257	42.6	−4.2
Liberal Democrats hold		Swing		

Tophill East
Party	Candidate	Votes	%	±%
Independent	David Hawkins	369	42.9	+15.5
Independent	Jacqui Redfern	252	29.3	+11.8
UKIP	Sylvia Bradley	126	14.7	+14.7
Labour	Jo Atwell	113	13.1	−1.6
Majority		117	13.6	+9.3
Turnout		860	33.5	−1.8
Independent hold		Swing		

Tophill West
Party	Candidate	Votes	%	±%
Conservative	John Nash	726	67.2	+46.4
Labour	Sandy West	355	32.8	+16.8
Majority		371	34.4	
Turnout		1,081	27.6	−4.8
Conservative hold		Swing		

Upwey and Broadwey
Party	Candidate	Votes	%	±%
Conservative	Michael Goodman	435	36.1	−4.5
Labour	Colin Huckle	361	30.0	+4.5
Liberal Democrats	David Beaman	317	26.3	−7.7
Green	David Smith	91	7.6	+7.6
Majority		74	6.1	−0.5
Turnout		1,204	42.2	+1.1
Conservative hold		Swing		

Westham North
Party	Candidate	Votes	%	±%
Liberal Democrats	Brendan Webster	647	42.1	−27.1
Labour	Andy Hutchings	546	35.6	+4.8
Conservative	John Ives	342	22.3	+22.3
Majority		101	6.5	−31.9
Turnout		1,535	36.8	−4.4
Liberal Democrats gain from Labour		Swing		

Westham West
Party	Candidate	Votes	%	±%
Conservative	Jean Woodward	434	35.3	
Liberal Democrats	Gill Taylor	411	33.4	
Labour	Venessa Collins	384	31.2	
Majority		23	1.9	
Turnout		1,229	43.1	−2.1
Conservative hold		Swing		

Wey Valley
Party	Candidate	Votes	%	±%
Conservative	Pamela Nixon	799	62.0	+8.3
Labour	Alan Chedzoy	391	30.4	−3.4
Green	Brian Heatley	98	7.6	−4.9
Majority		408	31.6	+11.7
Turnout		1,288	45.4	+0.5
Conservative hold		Swing		

Weymouth East
Party	Candidate	Votes	%	±%
Conservative	Roger Allen	484	39.9	
Liberal Democrats	John Birtwistle	438	36.1	
Labour	Richard Baker	220	18.2	
Green	Ian Poyser	44	3.6	
Monster Raving Loony	Dominic Lonsdale	26	2.1	
Majority		46	3.8	
Turnout		1,212	42.4	+0.2
Conservative gain from Liberal Democrats		Swing		

Weymouth West
Party	Candidate	Votes	%	±%
Conservative	Richard Kosior	680	40.6	+0.7
Labour	Andy Blackwood	614	36.6	+6.4
Liberal Democrats	Richard Daly	234	14.0	−15.9
Independent	Angie Barnes	148	8.8	+8.8
Majority		66	4.0	−5.7
Turnout		1,676	41.1	−3.0
Conservative gain from Labour		Swing		

Wyke Regis
Party	Candidate	Votes	%	±%
Labour	Anne Kenwood	700	42.4	+8.5
Conservative	Margaret Alsop	628	38.1	+1.5
Independent	Jack Biggs	321	19.5	+0.7
Majority		72	4.3	
Turnout		1,649	38.3	−4.8
Labour gain from Conservative		Swing		
