= Peter Hanning =

Peter Hanning (9 April 1945 - 18 May 2015) was the Connétable of the Parish of St Saviour in Jersey from 2007 until 2011.

== Political career ==
On 24 August 2007, Hanning was sworn in as Connétable of St Saviour in the Royal Court of Jersey. As Connétable, he represented the parish in the States of Jersey. He was nominated to the States of Jersey Planning Applications Panel.
