= 2007 St Albans City and District Council election =

2007 UK local government election

Map of the results of the 2007 St Albans City and District Council election. Liberal Democrats in yellow, Conservatives in blue and Labour in red.

The 2007 St Albans City and District Council election took place on 3 May 2007 to elect members of St Albans District Council in Hertfordshire, England. One third of the council was up for election and the Liberal Democrats lost overall control of the council to no overall control.

After the election, the composition of the council was:

- Liberal Democrats 29
- Conservative 19
- Labour 8
- Independent 2

== Campaign ==
A total of 83 candidates from the Liberal Democrats, Conservatives, Labour and Green Party stood in the election. Each party contested every ward, apart from in London Colney where the Green candidate was disqualified due to an incorrect nomination. Each ward had one seat up for election apart from in Harpenden West where two seats were contested as a Conservative councillor stood down early due to illness. The other parties needed to gain 3 seats from the Liberal Democrats to remove them from power, with a 2-seat drop meaning the Liberal Democrats would depend on the mayor's casting vote to remain in power.

After the Conservatives won the most votes in the previous 2006 election they were hoping to make gains, with Harpenden East, Marshalswick South, Verulam and Wheathampstead seen as being possible gains. Meanwhile, the Liberal Democrats defended their record in running the council during the election. They called for St Albans to be Hertfordshire's "premier community" and pointed to the Audit Commission rating the council as one of the 10 most improving in the country.

6 sitting councillors stood down at the election including a former Conservative cabinet member Chris Whiteside and a former Labour mayor Malcolm MacMillan.

== Election result ==
The Liberal Democrats lost their overall majority after losing 2 seats to the Conservatives, dropping to exactly half of the council with 29 councillors. The 2 Conservative gains from the Liberal Democrats came in Harpenden East and Redbourn wards to lift the party to 19 seats and the Conservatives received around 2,000 votes more than the Liberal Democrats. There was no change elsewhere on the council, with Labour staying on 8 seats, despite dropping to fourth place in several wards and there also remained 2 independent councillors. Overall turnout at the election was 43.6%.

Following the election the Liberal Democrats remained in control of the council after one of the independent councillors, Tony Swendell, abstained on the vote to decide the composition of the cabinet.

St Albans local election result 2007
Party	Seats	Gains	Losses	Net gain/loss	Seats %	Votes %	Votes	+/−
Liberal Democrats	10	0	2	-2	47.6	37.8	16,643	+2.1%
Conservative	8	2	0	+2	38.1	42.6	18,759	+0.9%
Labour	3	0	0	0	14.3	12.9	5,669	-1.7%
Green	0	0	0	0	0	6.8	3,015	-1.3%

== Ward results ==
Ashley
Party	Candidate	Votes	%	±%
Liberal Democrats	Iqbal Zia	793	41.3	+3.2
Conservative	Rafat Khan	466	24.3	−0.6
Labour	Alistair Cooper	390	20.3	−6.6
Green	Sasha Bradbury	270	14.1	+4.0
Majority		327	17.0	+5.8
Turnout		1,919	36.2	−7.5
Liberal Democrats hold		Swing		

Batchwood
Party	Candidate	Votes	%	±%
Labour	Martin Leach	695	34.6	−4.0
Liberal Democrats	Allan Witherick	603	30.1	+2.7
Conservative	Sara Cadish	515	25.7	+1.2
Green	Gillian Mills	193	9.6	+0.1
Majority		92	4.5	−6.7
Turnout		2,006	38.6	−3.8
Labour hold		Swing		

Clarence
Party	Candidate	Votes	%	±%
Liberal Democrats	Sheila Burton	1,070	53.9	+11.2
Conservative	Indranil Chakravorty	433	21.8	−5.9
Green	Peter Eggleston	255	12.8	−1.1
Labour	Christine Pearce	229	11.5	−4.3
Majority		637	32.1	+17.1
Turnout		1,987	42.8	−4.5
Liberal Democrats hold		Swing		

Colney Heath
Party	Candidate	Votes	%	±%
Liberal Democrats	Chris Brazier	1,114	67.3	+18.0
Conservative	Joanne Vessey	403	24.3	−12.6
Labour	Richard Bruckdorfer	77	4.6	−4.1
Green	Rosalind Hardy	62	3.7	−1.3
Majority		711	43.0	+30.6
Turnout		1,656	40.2	−1.6
Liberal Democrats hold		Swing		

Cunningham
Party	Candidate	Votes	%	±%
Liberal Democrats	Robert Donald	1,114	53.9	+12.4
Conservative	James Vessey	578	27.9	−2.3
Labour	John Paton	226	10.9	−8.2
Green	Jack Easton	150	7.3	−1.9
Majority		536	26.0	−14.7
Turnout		2,068	43.9	−2.6
Liberal Democrats hold		Swing		

Harpenden East
Party	Candidate	Votes	%	±%
Conservative	Michael Wakely	1,183	50.3	+8.3
Liberal Democrats	Jeff Phillips	890	37.8	−7.8
Labour	David Crew	170	7.2	+0.4
Green	Denise Taylor-Roome	109	4.6	−1.0
Majority		293	12.5	
Turnout		2,352	45.3	−2.9
Conservative gain from Liberal Democrats		Swing		

Harpenden North
Party	Candidate	Votes	%	±%
Conservative	Bert Pawle	1,260	63.7	+5.6
Liberal Democrats	Gordon Burrow	420	21.2	−6.0
Labour	Rosemary Ross	167	8.4	+0.6
Green	Annett Tate	132	6.7	−0.2
Majority		840	42.5	+11.6
Turnout		1,979	39.1	−3.5
Conservative hold		Swing		

Harpenden South
Party	Candidate	Votes	%	±%
Conservative	Paul Foster	1,582	74.2	+2.1
Liberal Democrats	Mary Carden	256	12.0	−2.0
Labour	Linda Spiri	172	8.1	+0.9
Green	Lorna Hann	123	5.8	−0.9
Majority		1,326	62.2	+4.1
Turnout		2,133	41.0	−3.1
Conservative hold		Swing		

Harpenden West (2 seats)
Party	Candidate	Votes	%	±%
Conservative	Daniel Chicester-Miles	1,549	65.6	−1.9
Conservative	Julian Daly	1,533	64.9	−2.6
Liberal Democrats	Albert Moses	448	19.0	+1.8
Liberal Democrats	Tom Addiscott	438	18.5	+1.3
Green	Marc Scheimann	238	10.1	+1.4
Labour	Benjamin Dearman	196	8.3	+1.7
Labour	Elizabeth Rayner	183	7.7	+1.1
Turnout		2,362	43.6	−1.3
Conservative hold		Swing		
Conservative hold		Swing		

London Colney
Party	Candidate	Votes	%	±%
Labour	Katherine Gardner	889	45.3	+0.6
Conservative	David Winstone	854	43.5	+6.7
Liberal Democrats	Carol Prowse	221	11.3	+0.1
Majority		35	1.8	−6.1
Turnout		1,964	30.4	−4.7
Labour hold		Swing		

Marshalswick North
Party	Candidate	Votes	%	±%
Liberal Democrats	Geoff Churchard	1,200	54.6	+4.0
Conservative	John Foster	744	33.8	−0.8
Labour	Ruairi Mccourt	138	6.3	−1.3
Green	Rosalind Paul	117	5.3	−1.9
Majority		456	20.8	+4.8
Turnout		2,199	45.9	−4.2
Liberal Democrats hold		Swing		

Marshalswick South
Party	Candidate	Votes	%	±%
Liberal Democrats	Kate Morris	1,177	47.8	+10.2
Conservative	Jeffrey Groman	843	34.2	−4.7
Labour	Anthony Nicholson	270	11.0	−2.5
Green	Tim Blackwell	172	7.0	−2.9
Majority		334	13.6	
Turnout		2,462	48.3	−2.8
Liberal Democrats hold		Swing		

Park Street
Party	Candidate	Votes	%	±%
Liberal Democrats	Nicola Mcalistair-Baillie	1,042	49.5	−2.5
Conservative	Margaret Griffiths	809	38.5	+1.9
Labour	Laurence Chester	160	7.6	+0.4
Green	Stephen Clough	93	4.4	+0.1
Majority		233	11.0	−4.4
Turnout		2,104	40.6	−5.6
Liberal Democrats hold		Swing		

Redbourn
Party	Candidate	Votes	%	±%
Conservative	Maxine Crawley	1,007	46.4	−4.3
Liberal Democrats	Colin O'Donovan	991	45.6	+9.2
Labour	Gavin Ross	95	4.4	−2.3
Green	Kate Metcalf	79	3.6	−2.6
Majority		16	0.8	−13.5
Turnout		2,172	47.1	+2.3
Conservative gain from Liberal Democrats		Swing		

Sandridge
Party	Candidate	Votes	%	±%
Conservative	Frances Leonard	854	57.8	+2.0
Liberal Democrats	Janet Churchard	329	22.3	−3.3
Labour	Jane Cloke	162	11.0	+1.4
Green	Naomi Love	133	9.0	−0.1
Majority		525	35.5	+5.3
Turnout		1,478	39.4	−3.4
Conservative hold		Swing		

Sopwell
Party	Candidate	Votes	%	±%
Labour	Eileen Harris	704	37.0	+7.1
Liberal Democrats	Roger Axworthy	612	32.2	−1.0
Conservative	Heather Rench	393	20.7	−4.8
Green	Thomas Hardy	193	10.1	−1.3
Majority		92	4.8	
Turnout		1,902	38.1	−2.2
Labour hold		Swing		

St Peters
Party	Candidate	Votes	%	±%
Liberal Democrats	Jack Pia	770	40.0	−5.4
Conservative	Debashis Mukherjee	419	21.7	+2.0
Labour	Mick Jewitt	375	19.5	−3.5
Green	Simon Grover	363	18.8	+6.9
Majority		351	18.3	−4.1
Turnout		1,927	36.8	−2.9
Liberal Democrats hold		Swing		

St Stephen
Party	Candidate	Votes	%	±%
Conservative	Gordon Myland	1,244	59.1	+0.7
Liberal Democrats	Thomas Allum	600	28.5	+2.4
Labour	Janet Blackwell	171	8.1	−0.7
Green	Lydia El-Khouri	90	4.3	−2.4
Majority		644	30.6	−1.7
Turnout		2,105	41.9	−4.6
Conservative hold		Swing		

Verulam
Party	Candidate	Votes	%	±%
Liberal Democrats	Martin Frearson	1,357	51.9	+9.6
Conservative	Keith Cotton	987	37.7	−6.5
Green	Margaret Grover	149	5.7	−2.3
Labour	Jill Gipps	122	4.7	−0.8
Majority		370	14.2	
Turnout		2,615	52.3	−1.2
Liberal Democrats hold		Swing		

Wheathampstead
Party	Candidate	Votes	%	±%
Liberal Democrats	Chris Oxley	1,198	48.4	+2.6
Conservative	Keith Stammers	1,103	44.6	−1.2
Green	Meg Davis	94	3.8	−0.9
Labour	Peter Woodhams	78	3.2	−0.6
Majority		95	3.8	+3.8
Turnout		2,473	54.1	0.0
Liberal Democrats hold		Swing		
