= 2009 San Antonio mayoral election =

- May 9, 2009
- Turnout: 11.61% ▲
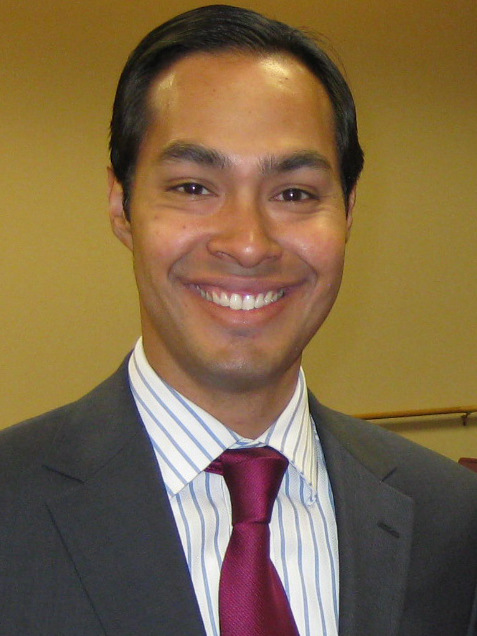

Candidate	Julian Castro	Trish DeBerry-Mejia	Diane G. Cibrian
Popular vote	42,745	22,031	6,181
Percentage	56.23%	28.98%	8.13%
Mayor before election
Phil Hardberger
Elected mayor
Julian Castro

The San Antonio mayoral election of 2009 was held on May 9, 2009. The incumbent mayor Phil Hardberger was term-limited after serving two terms. The election was won by Julian Castro, who took office on June 1, 2009. The election was officially nonpartisan.

== Announced candidates ==
- Lauro Bustamante
- Julian Castro, former City Councilman and 2005 mayoral candidate
- Diane Cibrian, City Councilwoman (District 8)
- Trish DeBerry-Mejia, PR consultant and small business owner
- Michael "Commander" Idrogo, perennial candidate
- Napoleon Madrid
- Sheila D. McNeil, City Councilwoman (District 2)
- Julie Iris Oldham, perennial candidate
- Rhett R. Smith, perennial candidate

== Frontrunner status ==
After the deadline to file passed, four candidates (Castro, Cibrian, McNeil and DeBerry-Mejia) were considered the frontrunners in the race. Polls showed Castro ahead by big margins, and some polls showed Castro winning outright without need for a runoff election. Second place was highly contentious, with Cibrian and DeBerry-Mejia trading off for second place.

== Election day ==
On May 9, 2009, the election for Mayor was held. Turnout was slightly higher in the May 2009 election than the May 2007 election, with 11.61% of registered voters casting a ballot in the 2009 election (as opposed to 10.16% in 2007). Also, more votes were cast during early voting than on election day (55,780 votes cast during early voting to 34,055 on election day.)

A majority of votes is required to win the office of Mayor of San Antonio. If no person earns a majority, the two top vote earners shall advance to a runoff election to decide. Mayoral elections are non-partisan.

San Antonio Mayor, 2009 Regular election, May 9, 2009
Candidate		Votes	%	±
✓	Julian Castro	42,745	56.23%	
	Trish DeBerry-Mejia	22,031	28.98%	
	Diane G. Cibrian	6,181	8.13%	
	Sheila D. McNeil	2,962	3.90%	
	Rhett R. Smith	715	0.94%	
	Lauro Bustamante	441	0.58%	
	Julie Iris Oldham	385	0.51%	
	Michael "Commander" Idrogo	371	0.49%	
	Napoleon Madrid	188	0.25%	
Turnout		76,019	9.83%*	

* Vote percentage only include votes for San Antonio Mayor. The remaining 1.78 percent in the election voted for different constituencies, or did not cast a vote for Mayor of San Antonio
