= 2007 Slave Lake municipal election =

The 2007 Slave Lake municipal election was held Monday, October 15, 2007. Since 1968, provincial legislation has required every municipality to hold triennial elections. The citizens of Slave Lake, Alberta, elected one mayor and six councillors (all at large), and participated in electing two of the High Prairie School Division No. 48's eight trustees (as Ward 4). The voters were also asked a series of plebiscite questions. Of the eligible voters, only 1,261 turned in a ballot, an average of 4.5 councillors per ballot.

== Results ==
Bold indicates elected, and incumbents are italicized.

=== Mayor ===
Mayor
Candidate	Votes	%
**Karina Pillay-Kinnee**	**731**	**58.0%**
Christopher Jones	530	42.0%

=== Councillors ===
Councillors
Candidate	Votes	%
**Ed Procyshyn**	**930**	**16.35%**
**Valerie Tradewell**	**880**	**15.47%**
**Rob Chalmers**	**845**	**14.85%**
**Elaine Carmichael**	**814**	**14.31%**
**Rob Irwin**	**788**	**13.85%**
**Laura Vanderwell-Ross**	**731**	**12.85%**
George Snider	701	12.32%

=== Public School Trustees ===
High Prairie School Division No. 48
Ward 4
Candidate	Votes	%
**Lenny Richer**	**703**	**44.1%**
**Monica Smears**	**538**	**33.8%**
Natasha Albert	352	22.1%

Trustee Monica Edwards (née Smears) married in January 2008.

=== Questions ===
Public support of reducing the speed limit on Highway 2, through the Town of Slave Lake, from 80 km/h to 60 km/h
Selection	Votes	%
**In Favour**	**970**	**77.9%**
Opposed	275	22.1%

Public support of clearing additional beachfront within, or adjacent to the Town, for public use on Devonshire Beach
Selection	Votes	%
**In Favour**	**878**	**82.5%**
Opposed	186	17.5%

Catholic supporters for withdrawing from the Living Waters Catholic School Division No. 42
Selection	Votes	%
**In Favour**	**153**	**70.8%**
Opposed	63	29.2%
