= 2007 Tunbridge Wells Borough Council election =

2007 UK local government election

Results of the 2007 Tunbridge Wells Borough Council election

The 2007 Tunbridge Wells Borough Council election took place on 3 May 2007 to elect members of Tunbridge Wells Borough Council in Kent, England. One third of the council was up for election and the Conservative Party stayed in overall control of the council.

After the election, the composition of the council was:

- Conservative 41
- Liberal Democrat 7

== Election result ==
The results saw the Labour Party lose its last councillor, Ronnie Ooi, on the council. Ooi lost his seat in Southborough and High Brooms ward after campaigning by distancing himself from the national Labour government and calling on voters to preserve an opposition to the Conservatives on the council.

Tunbridge Wells local election result 2007
Party	Seats	Gains	Losses	Net gain/loss	Seats %	Votes %	Votes	+/−
Conservative	15	4	1	+3	93.8	57.2	13,455	−1.7%
Liberal Democrats	1	1	3	−2	6.3	27.9	6,571	−3.7%
UKIP	0	0	0	0	0	6.3	1,482	+4.6%
Labour	0	0	1	−1	0	5.9	1,391	+0.3%
Green	0	0	0	0	0	2.0	469	−0.2%
Independent	0	0	0	0	0	0.7	164	+0.7%

== Ward results ==
Benenden and Cranbrook
Party	Candidate	Votes	%	±%
Conservative	Linda Hall	1,170	58.5	−2.2
Liberal Democrats	Francis Rook	696	34.8	+3.9
UKIP	Oliver Clement	133	6.7	−1.7
Majority		474	23.7	−6.1
Turnout		1,999	38.9	+0.3
Conservative hold		Swing		

Culverden
Party	Candidate	Votes	%	±%
Conservative	John Miller	921	58.1	−0.5
Green	Brian Leslie	469	29.6	+15.0
UKIP	Patricia Theophanides	196	12.4	+12.4
Majority		452	28.5	−3.2
Turnout		1,586	32.6	−2.3
Conservative hold		Swing		

Frittenden and Sissinghurst
Party	Candidate	Votes	%	±%
Conservative	John Smith	505	63.7	−10.4
Liberal Democrats	Graham Lee	288	36.3	+10.4
Majority		217	27.4	−20.8
Turnout		793	47.3	+6.9
Conservative hold		Swing		

Goudhurst and Lamberhurst
Party	Candidate	Votes	%	±%
Conservative	John Bullock	806	64.6	−5.1
Liberal Democrats	John Billingham	297	23.8	−6.5
UKIP	Julie La Coste	144	11.5	+11.5
Majority		509	40.8	+1.4
Turnout		1,247	38.9	−3.9
Conservative hold		Swing		

Hawkhurst and Sandhurst
Party	Candidate	Votes	%	±%
Conservative	Ron Weeden	1,095	71.6	+1.7
Liberal Democrats	Keith Brown	435	28.4	−1.7
Majority		660	43.2	+3.4
Turnout		1,530	34.5	−0.4
Conservative hold		Swing		

Paddock Wood East
Party	Candidate	Votes	%	±%
Conservative	Peter Waldock	513	51.6	−13.2
Labour	Raymond Moon	193	19.4	+6.4
Independent	Ronald Goodman	164	16.5	+16.5
Liberal Democrats	Jamie Johnson	125	12.6	−9.6
Majority		349	32.2	−10.4
Turnout		995	32.7	+1.8
Conservative hold		Swing		

Paddock Wood West
Party	Candidate	Votes	%	±%
Conservative	Stanley Ward	646	79.0	+18.4
Labour	Raymond Steward	172	21.0	−0.1
Majority		474	58.0	+18.5
Turnout		818	28.2	−1.9
Conservative hold		Swing		

Pantiles and St Marks
Party	Candidate	Votes	%	±%
Conservative	Gillian Barber-Hughes	1,110	64.1	−4.5
Liberal Democrats	Jean-Luc Bressard	470	27.1	−4.3
UKIP	Beryl Woodall	152	8.8	+8.8
Majority		640	37.0	−0.2
Turnout		1,732	36.0	+1.0
Conservative hold		Swing		

Park
Party	Candidate	Votes	%	±%
Conservative	Sean Lockhart	1,115	58.6	−5.3
Liberal Democrats	Peter Hillier	616	32.4	−3.7
UKIP	Ian Peters	171	9.0	+9.0
Majority		499	26.2	−1.6
Turnout		1,902	35.8	−2.4
Conservative hold		Swing		

Pembury
Party	Candidate	Votes	%	±%
Conservative	June Crowhurst	955	54.3	−1.9
Liberal Democrats	Lorraine Braam	687	39.0	−4.8
UKIP	Christopher Luke	118	6.7	+6.7
Majority		268	15.3	+2.9
Turnout		1,760	39.7	−5.0
Conservative gain from Liberal Democrats		Swing		

Rusthall
Party	Candidate	Votes	%	±%
Conservative	Barry Edwards	528	45.1	+16.9
Liberal Democrats	Christopher Gillmore	321	27.4	−24.2
UKIP	June Moore	175	15.0	+4.2
Labour	Lorna Blackmore	146	12.5	+3.1
Majority		207	17.7	−5.7
Turnout		1,170	34.1	−4.4
Conservative gain from Liberal Democrats		Swing		

St John's
Party	Candidate	Votes	%	±%
Liberal Democrats	Lesley Herriot	836	50.4	+13.0
Conservative	Brian Ransley	708	42.7	−2.0
UKIP	Philip Crofton	116	7.0	+7.0
Majority		128	7.7	
Turnout		1,660	34.5	−1.0
Liberal Democrats gain from Conservative		Swing		

Sherwood
Party	Candidate	Votes	%	±%
Conservative	Robert Mayall	675	46.6	−7.1
Liberal Democrats	Alan Bullion	405	28.0	−0.4
Labour	Katherine Wilson	218	15.0	−2.9
UKIP	Victor Webb	151	10.4	+10.4
Majority		270	18.6	−6.7
Turnout		1,449	30.6	−0.3
Conservative hold		Swing		

Southborough and High Brooms
Party	Candidate	Votes	%	±%
Conservative	John Chater	658	37.4	−12.0
Labour	Ronnie Ooi	582	33.1	+0.4
Liberal Democrats	Marguerita Morton	394	22.4	+4.5
UKIP	Christopher Hoare	126	7.2	+7,2
Majority		76	4.3	−12.4
Turnout		1,760	34.3	+0.6
Conservative gain from Labour		Swing		

Southborough North
Party	Candidate	Votes	%	±%
Conservative	David Elliott	748	54.5	−3.3
Liberal Democrats	Trevor Poile	544	39.7	+5.3
Labour	Antony Wood	80	5.8	−2.0
Majority		204	14.8	−8.6
Turnout		1,372	43.9	−1.2
Conservative gain from Liberal Democrats		Swing		

Speldhurst and Bidborough
Party	Candidate	Votes	%	±%
Conservative	David Jukes	1,302	74.0	−1.6
Liberal Democrats	Ian Williams	457	26.0	+1.6
Majority		845	48.0	−3.2
Turnout		1,759	39.5	−2.8
Conservative hold		Swing		
