= 2007 Wood Buffalo municipal election =

The 2007 Regional Municipality of Wood Buffalo municipal election was held Monday, October 15, 2007. Since 1968, provincial legislation has required every municipality to hold triennial elections. The citizens of the Regional Municipality of Wood Buffalo, (this includes the Urban Service Area of Fort McMurray,) Alberta, elected one mayor, nine of their ten councillors, the five Fort McMurray Public School District trustees (in Fort McMurray), and four of the Northland School Division No. 61's 23 school boards (outside Fort McMurray, five trustees each). The incumbent Ward 3 Councillor had no challengers, and the five trustee candidates for the Fort McMurray Roman Catholic Separate School District No. 32 (in Fort McMurray) were unchallenged.

== Results ==
Bold indicates elected, and incumbents are italicized.

=== Mayor ===
Mayor
Candidate	Votes	%
**Melissa Blake**	**5,115**	**64.6%**
David W. Kirschner	2,431	30.7%
George A. Mercredi	263	3.3%
David W. Rowbottom	110	1.4%

=== Councillors ===
Councillors
Ward 1			Ward 2			Ward 3			Ward 4		
Candidate	Votes	%	Candidate	Votes	%	Candidate	Votes	%	Candidate	Votes	%
**Sheldon Germain**	**4,828**	**14.38%**	**David A. Blair**	**261**	**30.3%**	**Renee Rebus**	**Acclaimed**		**Gordon S. Janvier**	**133**	**39.5%**
**John Vyboh**	**4,493**	**13.38%**	**John H. Chadi**	**191**	**22.2%**				Mickey Cadden	129	38.3%
**Mike Allen**	**4,375**	**13.03%**	John Rigney	160	18.6%				Elmer Herman	75	22.3%
**Phillip J. Meagher**	**4,312**	**12.84%**	Lloyd (Sonny) Flett	141	16.4%						
**Sharon Clarkson**	**3,847**	**11.46%**	Lily Elsie Marchel	107	12.4%						
**Mila Byron**	**3,148**	**9.38%**									
Jim Carbery	2,571	7.66%									
Ross Jacobs	1,879	5.60%									
Robynn Pavia	1,371	4.08%									
Trevor Mulligan	848	2.53%									
John Ridley	848	2.53%									
Gregory J. Lucas	571	1.70%									
Wasim S. Bhatti	479	1.43%									

==== By-Election ====
On March 11, 2008, Ward 2 Councillor John Chadi resigned from council. A by-election was held on June 9 to fill the empty seat, former Councillor, and 2007 candidate, Sonny Flett was elected. He was official sworn in on June 24, 2008.

Wood Buffalo By-election
Ward 3
Candidate	Votes	%
**Lloyd (Sonny) Flett**	**119**	**35.6%**
Archie Cyprien	90	26.9%
Arsene (Adam) Bernaille	81	24.3%
John Rigney	44	13.2%

=== Public School Trustees ===
Fort McMurray Public School District
Candidate	Votes	%
**Jeff Thompson**	**2,901**	**21.03%**
**Angela Adams**	**2,510**	**18.20%**
**Glenn Cooper**	**2,094**	**15.18%**
**Glen Doonanco**	**2,073**	**15.03%**
**Elizabeth Eenkooren**	**1,624**	**11.77%**
Munira Manji	1,308	9.48%
Joel Lipman	1,282	9.30%

Northland School Division No. 61
Fort Chipewyan			Anzac			Janvier			Conklin		
Candidate	Votes	%	Ward 1			Candidate	Votes	%	Candidate	Votes	%
**Claris Voyageur**	**261**	**15.97**	**Shirley Klassen**	**Acclaimed**		**Rose Marie Herman**	**52**	**15.2%**	**Wendy Tremblay**	**56**	**17.7%**
**Blue-Eyes Simpson**	**221**	**13.53**	Ward 2			**Darrell Herman**	**47**	**13.8%**	**Margaret A. Quintal**	**55**	**17.4%**
**Dana Wylie**	**183**	**11.20**	Candidate	Votes	%	**Gordon S. Janvier**	**47**	**13.8%**	**Shirley A. Tremblay**	**49**	**15.5%**
**Julia Cardinal**	**178**	**10.89**	**Nadine C. Finch**	**139**	**22.9%**	**Jules M. Nokohoo**	**47**	**13.8%**	**Shawnene Lavallee**	**44**	**13.9%**
**B. Joyce Smorong**	**159**	**9.73**	**Tammy Huska**	**121**	**19.9%**	**Alice Lofstrom**	**36**	**10.6%**	**Pamela G. Tremblay**	**32**	**10.1%**
Alice Rigney	156	9.55	**Yvette Simon**	**99**	**16.3%**	Shirley D. Montgrand	35	10.3%	Sherry Y. Quintal	27	8.5%
Lorraine Cardinal	141	8.63	**Darrol C. Carelse**	**93**	**15.3%**	Daniel H. Herman	31	9.1%	Deloris B. Pruden	23	7.3%
Darlene E. Voyageur	129	7.89	Joyce K. Quintal	81	13.3%	Lena Herman	15	4.4%	Linda Ward	19	6.0%
Leona (Cowie) Lepine	121	7.41	Lori Ann Fedechko	75	12.3%	Bertha Anne Moir	14	4.1%	Walter (Wally) Kaziuk	12	3.8%
Sean Sommerfield	85	5.20				David Janvier	12	3.5%			
						Ron Eldridge	5	1.5%			

=== Separate School Trustees ===
Fort McMurray Roman Catholic Separate School District No. 32
Candidate	Votes	%
**Laurelee Bouchard-Dutchyn**	**Acclaimed**	
**Geraldine Carbery**	**Acclaimed**	
**Terry Langis**	**Acclaimed**	
**Keith McGrath**	**Acclaimed**	
**Maria Salvo-Vyboh**	**Acclaimed**	
