= 2007 Spruce Grove municipal election =

The 2007 Spruce Grove municipal election was held Monday, October 15, 2007. Since 1968, provincial legislation has required every municipality to hold triennial elections. The citizens of Spruce Grove, Alberta, elected one mayor, six aldermen (all at large), and two of the seven trustees of Parkland School Division No. 70 (as Ward 5). The incumbent mayor Ken Scott, did not run, and the three incumbent Evergreen Catholic Separate Regional Division No. 2 Ward 2 trustees were not challenged (Spruce Grove being part of Ward 2, total nine trustees). All four aldermen who re-ran were elected. Of the approximately 15,000 eligible voters, only 4,435 turned in a ballot, a voter turnout of 29.6%, and an average of 4.6 aldermen per ballot.

== Results ==
Bold indicates elected, and incumbents are italicized.

=== Mayor ===
Mayor
Candidate	Votes	%
**Stuart Houston**	**2,080**	**46.9%**
Bill Kasenko	1,575	35.5%
Dan Saunders	780	17.6%

=== Aldermen ===
Aldermen
Candidate	Votes	%
**Jeff Acker**	**3,158**	**15.58%**
**Randy Palivoda**	**3,002**	**14.81%**
**Wayne Rothe**	**2,930**	**14.46%**
**Bill Steinburg**	**2,908**	**14.35%**
**Louise Baxter**	**2,891**	**14.27%**
**Glenn Jensen**	**2,121**	**10.47%**
John “Ace” Acevedo	1,777	8.77%
Ron Cairns	1,478	7.29%

=== Public School Trustees ===
Parkland School Division No. 70
Ward 5
Candidate	Votes	%
**Dorcas Kilduff**	**2,010**	**40.7%**
**Darcy Kolodnicki**	**1,590**	**32.2%**
Chrysi Rubin	1,336	27.1%

=== Separate School Trustees ===
Evergreen Catholic Separate Regional Division No. 2
Ward 2
Candidate	Votes	%
**Gerald Bernakevitch**	**Acclaimed**	
**Robert Vasseur**	**Acclaimed**	
**Richard Yaceyko**	**Acclaimed**	
