= 2007 Cuban local elections =

Local elections were held in Cuba on 21 October, 28 October and 31 October 2007. These elections are of national importance as they are the only direct elections in Cuba's political system, and because the municipal and provincial assemblies elect half the members of the National Assembly of People's Power, which in turn elects the President of Cuba. Therefore, this election will indirectly determine whether Fidel Castro will remain president or whether the vice-president and acting president Raúl Castro (his brother) will officially take over.

According to official results, turnout was 96.49%. Of all ballots handed in, 3.93% were blank, 3.08% were invalid and 92.99% were valid. 12,208 municipal delegates were elected in the 15,236 electoral constituencies of the country in the first round, and another 3,028 were chosen in the second round on 28 October 2007. However, four delegates were only elected in a third round on 31 October 2007. 4,159 or 27.30% of the elected are women, and 2,582 or 16.95% are between 16 and 35 years old; 6,406 delegates were reelected.
