= 2007 Lebanese by-elections =

By-elections were held in Lebanon on 5 August 2007 to replace two assassinated MPs, Pierre Amine Gemayel of the Kataeb Party (killed on the 21 November 2006) and Walid Eido of the Future Movement (killed on the 13 June 2007). Their respective districts were Matn District and Beirut 2nd District.

== Beirut election ==
In the Beirut election, the following stood for election:

- Mohammad Amin Itani for the Future Movement (March 14 Alliance) — 22,988
- Ibrahim Halabi for the People's Movement (March 8 Alliance) — 3,556

The seat was won by Mohammed al-Amin Itani, a candidate of parliament majority leader Saad Hariri's Future Movement, with a large majority. The Hezbollah-led pro-Syrian opposition did not officially sponsor a candidate. Turnout was very low, at just 19 per cent.

== Matn election ==
In the Matn election, the following stood for election:

- Camille Khoury for the Free Patriotic Movement (March 8 Alliance) — 39,534
- Former president Sheikh Amine Gemayel for the Kataeb Party (March 14 Alliance) — 39,116
- Joseph Mansour Asmar, an independent — ≤1,000

Khoury won a narrow victory with 39,534 votes, against Gemayel's 39,116 votes. Gemayel accused the March 8 Alliance of fraud. The turnout was 46 per cent.
