= 2007 Phoenix mayoral election =

- September 11, 2007
- Turnout: 18.69%
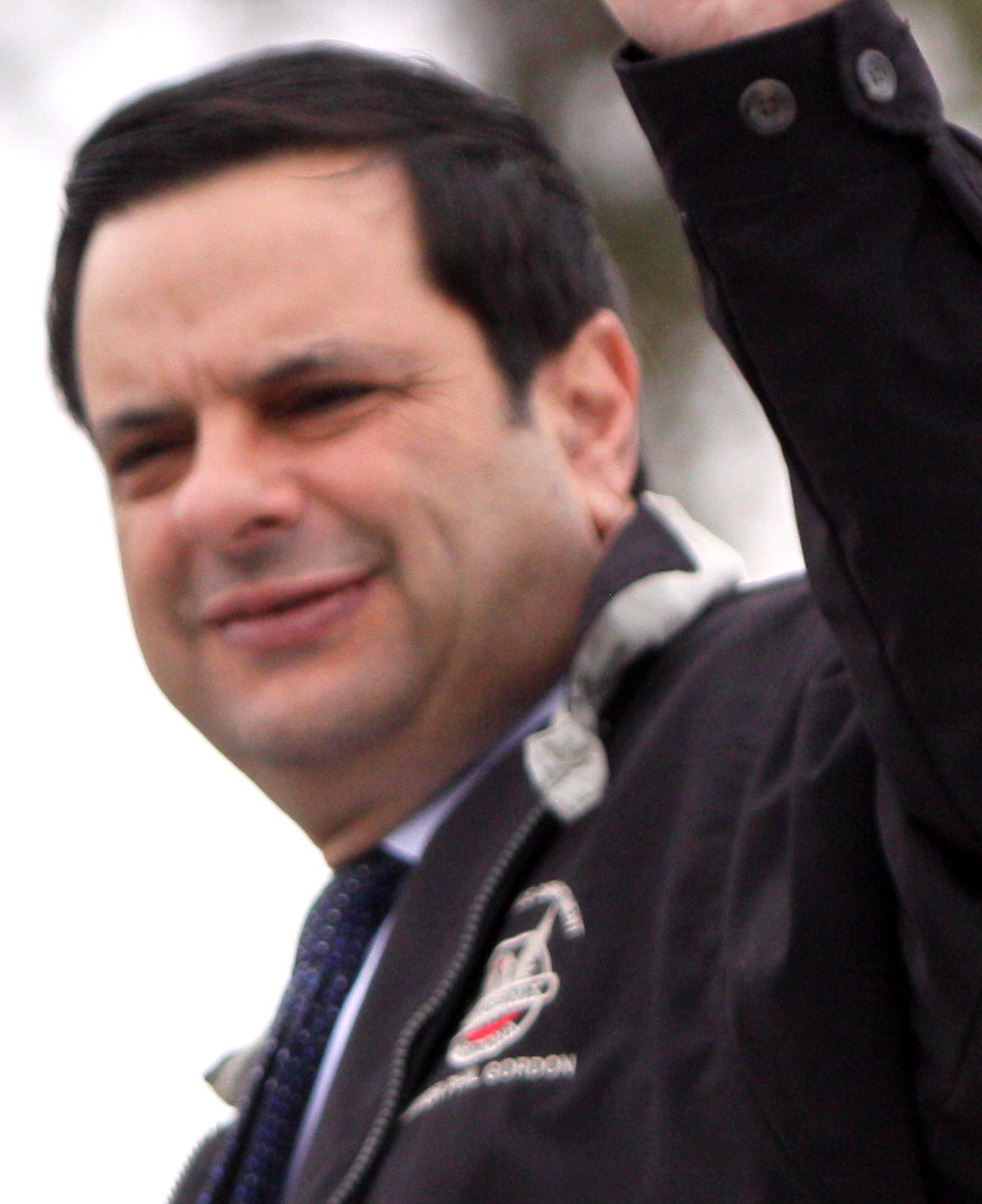

Candidate	Phil Gordon	Steve Lory
Popular vote	73,101	21,868
Percentage	76.95%	23.02%
Mayor before election
Phil Gordon
Democratic
Elected mayor
Phil Gordon
Democratic

The 2007 Phoenix mayoral election took place on September 11, 2007, to elect the Mayor of Phoenix, Arizona. The election was held concurrently with the elections to City Council Districts 1, 3, 5, and 7.

The election is officially nonpartisan. Incumbent mayor Phil Gordon was re-elected to a second term in office.

== General election ==
Election results
Candidate	Votes	%
Phil Gordon (incumbent)	73,101	76.95
Steve Lory	21,868	23.02
Write-in	32	0.03
Total votes	95,001	100.00

== See also ==
- List of mayors of Phoenix
