= Results of the 2007 United Kingdom local elections (metropolitan boroughs) =

== Metropolitan boroughs ==
All 36 English Metropolitan borough councils had one third of their seats up for election.

Council	Previous control	Result	Details
Barnsley	Labour	Labour hold	Details
Birmingham	No overall control	No overall control hold	Details
Bolton	No overall control	No overall control hold	Details
Bradford	No overall control	No overall control hold	Details
Bury	No overall control	No overall control hold	Details
Calderdale	No overall control	No overall control hold	Details
Coventry	Conservative	Conservative hold	Details
Doncaster	No overall control	No overall control hold	Details
Dudley	Conservative	Conservative hold	Details
Gateshead	Labour	Labour hold	Details
Kirklees	No overall control	No overall control hold	Details
Knowsley	Labour	Labour hold	Details
Leeds	No overall control	No overall control hold	Details
Liverpool	Liberal Democrats	Liberal Democrats hold	Details
Manchester	Labour	Labour hold	Details
Newcastle upon Tyne	Liberal Democrats	Liberal Democrats hold	Details
North Tyneside	No overall control	No overall control hold	Details
Oldham	Labour	No overall control	Details
Rochdale	No overall control	Liberal Democrats gain	Details
Rotherham	Labour	Labour hold	Details
Salford	Labour	Labour hold	Details
Sandwell	Labour	Labour hold	Details
Sefton	No overall control	No overall control hold	Details
Sheffield	Labour	No overall control gain	Details
Solihull	Conservative	No overall control gain	Details
South Tyneside	Labour	Labour hold	Details
St Helens	No overall control	No overall control hold	Details
Stockport	Liberal Democrats	Liberal Democrats hold	Details
Sunderland	Labour	Labour hold	Details
Tameside	Labour	Labour hold	Details
Trafford	Conservative	Conservative hold	Details
Wakefield	Labour	Labour hold	Details
Walsall	Conservative	Conservative hold	Details
Wigan	Labour	Labour hold	Details
Wirral	No overall control	No overall control hold	Details
Wolverhampton	Labour	Labour hold	Details
