= 2007 Tandridge District Council election =

2007 UK local government election

Map of the results of the 2007 Tandridge District Council election. Conservatives in blue, Liberal Democrats in yellow and independent in light grey. Wards in dark grey were not contested in 2007.

The 2007 Tandridge District Council election took place on 3 May 2007 to elect members of Tandridge District Council in Surrey, England. One third of the council was up for election and the Conservative Party stayed in overall control of the council.

After the election, the composition of the council was:

- Conservative 30
- Liberal Democrat 10
- Labour 1
- Independent 1

== Election result ==
Overall turnout at the election was 42.31%.

Tandridge local election result 2007
Party	Seats	Gains	Losses	Net gain/loss	Seats %	Votes %	Votes	+/−
Conservative	9	1	0	+1	64.3	54.8	10,382	-0.4%
Liberal Democrats	4	0	0	0	28.6	28.2	5,352	-5.9%
Independent	1	0	0	0	7.1	3.1	580	+3.1%
UKIP	0	0	0	0	0	7.7	1,467	+3.0%
Labour	0	0	1	-1	0	6.2	1,171	+0.8%

== Ward results ==
Bletchingley and Nuffield
Party	Candidate	Votes	%	±%
Conservative	Gill Black	1,096	67.2	+3.4
Liberal Democrats	Adam Bradbury	227	13.9	−4.5
UKIP	Graham Bailey	212	13.0	+1.3
Labour	David Wilbraham	97	5.9	−0.1
Majority		869	53.3	+7.9
Turnout		1,632	38.3	−1.5
Conservative hold		Swing		

Burstow, Horne and Outwood
Party	Candidate	Votes	%	±%
Conservative	Mike Keenan	1,141	72.4	+10.0
Liberal Democrats	Louise Martin	259	16.4	−7.6
UKIP	William Nock	175	11.1	−2.5
Majority		882	56.0	+17.6
Turnout		1,575	35.4	−3.0
Conservative hold		Swing		

Chaldon
Party	Candidate	Votes	%	±%
Conservative	Pat Cannon	461	72.1	+3.3
Liberal Democrats	Ann Lardeur	137	21.4	−9.8
UKIP	Janet Bailey	41	6.4	+6.4
Majority		324	50.7	+13.1
Turnout		639	45.9	+8.2
Conservative hold		Swing		

Dormansland and Felcourt
Party	Candidate	Votes	%	±%
Conservative	Robert Bisset	774	69.7	+0.8
Liberal Democrats	Tony Hardisty	212	19.1	−12.0
Labour	Samuel Hunt	66	5.9	+5.9
UKIP	David Milne	58	5.2	+5.2
Majority		562	50.6	+12.8
Turnout		1,110	38.3	−1.0
Conservative hold		Swing		

Felbridge
Party	Candidate	Votes	%	±%
Conservative	Ken Harwood	611	82.2	+6.8
Liberal Democrats	Kate Brickwood	95	12.8	−4.1
UKIP	Bradley Montgomery	37	5.0	−2.7
Majority		516	69.4	+10.9
Turnout		743	48.0	−3.9
Conservative hold		Swing		

Godstone
Party	Candidate	Votes	%	±%
Conservative	Hamish Beaton	976	60.1	+15.8
Liberal Democrats	Colin White	438	27.0	−14.6
UKIP	Richard Grant	120	7.4	−1.7
Labour	Maxine Mathews	91	5.6	+0.6
Majority		538	33.1	+30.4
Turnout		1,625	36.9	−9.9
Conservative hold		Swing		

Limpsfield
Party	Candidate	Votes	%	±%
Conservative	Colin Walker	741	61.0	−4.8
Liberal Democrats	Mark Wilson	386	31.8	−2.9
UKIP	June Stone	88	7.2	+7.2
Majority		355	29.2	−1.2
Turnout		1,215	44.0	−5.7
Conservative hold		Swing		

Lingfield and Crowhurst
Party	Candidate	Votes	%	±%
Liberal Democrats	Lisa Bangs	822	52.3	+4.8
Conservative	Mary Edwards	685	43.5	−9.0
UKIP	Evelyn Cooke	66	4.2	+4.2
Majority		137	8.8	
Turnout		1,573	51.6	−0.2
Liberal Democrats hold		Swing		

Oxted North and Tandridge
Party	Candidate	Votes	%	±%
Conservative	Martin Fisher	1,127	63.7	−3.3
Liberal Democrats	Anne-Marie Bunting	517	29.2	−3.8
UKIP	Elizabeth Fisher	125	7.1	+7.1
Majority		610	34.5	+0.5
Turnout		1,769	41.9	−4.3
Conservative hold		Swing		

Oxted South
Party	Candidate	Votes	%	±%
Conservative	Simon Ainsworth	987	46.2	+5.8
Labour	Robin Harling	738	34.6	−0.4
Liberal Democrats	Brigid McIntosh	232	10.9	−0.6
UKIP	Tony Stone	179	8.4	+0.8
Majority		249	11.6	+6.2
Turnout		2,136	49.2	−5.7
Conservative gain from Labour		Swing		

Portley
Party	Candidate	Votes	%	±%
Liberal Democrats	Christopher Botten	665	51.4	−9.5
Conservative	Jeremy Webster	497	38.4	−0.7
UKIP	John Norrington	73	5.6	+5.6
Labour	David Halliwell	60	4.6	+4.6
Majority		168	13.0	−8.8
Turnout		1,295	41.3	−3.6
Liberal Democrats hold		Swing		

Tatsfield and Titsey
Party	Candidate	Votes	%	±%
Independent	Bob David	580	70.6	+13.9
Conservative	Giles Hawkes	213	25.9	−16.6
UKIP	Kevin Alderton	29	3.5	+3.5
Majority		367	44.7	+30.5
Turnout		822	57.0	−7.0
Independent hold		Swing		

Valley
Party	Candidate	Votes	%	±%
Liberal Democrats	Jill Caudle	581	55.4	+25.2
Conservative	Jane Ingham	309	29.5	+2.7
UKIP	Martin Ferguson	89	8.5	−2.0
Labour	Colin Vane	69	6.6	−25.9
Majority		272	25.9	
Turnout		1,048	37.7	−8.4
Liberal Democrats hold		Swing		

Warlingham East, Chelsham and Farleigh
Party	Candidate	Votes	%	±%
Liberal Democrats	Ashley Burridge	781	44.1	−3.5
Conservative	Chris Camden	764	43.2	+3.2
UKIP	Martin Haley	175	9.9	−2.5
Labour	Peter McNeil	50	2.8	+2.8
Majority		17	0.9	−6.7
Turnout		1,770	42.9	−2.8
Liberal Democrats hold		Swing		
