= Tampa Fire Rescue Department =

Tampa Fire Department

Coordinates: 27°57′6″N 82°27′15.27″W

Operational area
- Country: United States
- State: Florida
- City: Tampa

Agency overview
- Established: 1884
- Annual calls: 88,917 (2017)
- Staffing: Career
- Fire chief: Barbara Tripp
- EMS level: ALS
- IAFF: 754

Facilities and equipment
- Battalions: 5
- Stations: 23
- Engines: 22
- Trucks: 6
- Ambulances: 18
- HAZMAT: 1
- Airport crash: 6
- Wildland: 4
- Fireboats: 4

Website
- Official website
- IAFF website

The Tampa Fire Rescue Department is the agency that provides fire protection and emergency medical services within the city of Tampa, Florida, United States. The department is also responsible for the handling of hazardous materials, aircraft rescue at the city's Tampa International Airport, and marine firefighting. A division of the department headed by the Fire Marshal is responsible for fire investigations, as well as review and enforcement of fire and building safety codes.

== History ==
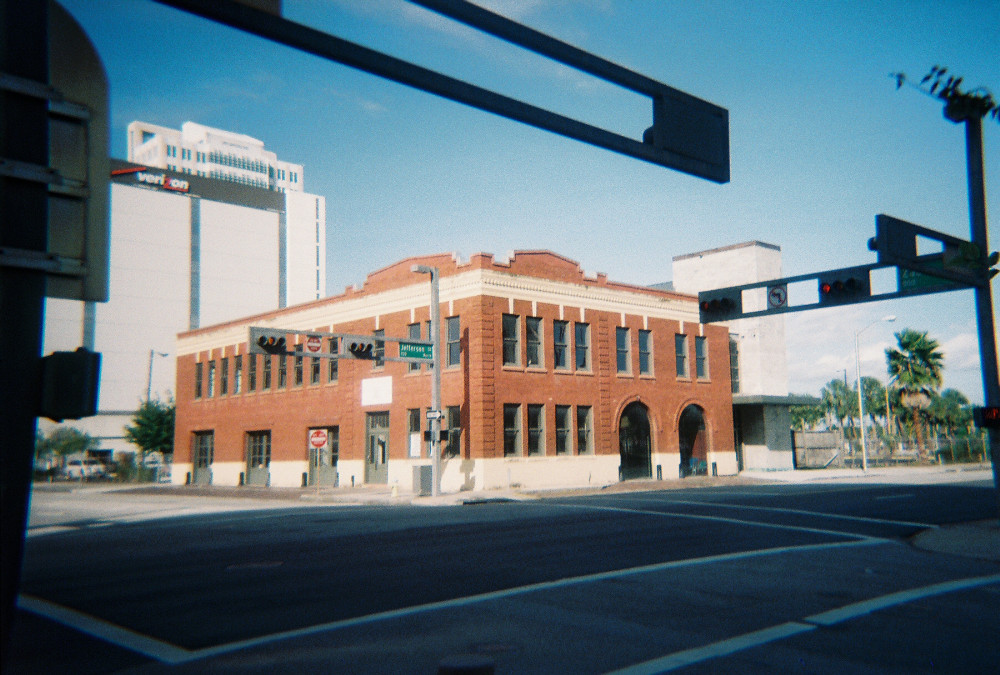
Old Fire Station No. 1, built in 1911, has been converted into a museum.

Tampa's first organized volunteer fire department began in 1884 with seven "bucket brigades" organized to serve the city. Eleven years later in 1895, the city council passed an ordinance authorizing Tampa's first professional and paid fire department. In July 1914 the horse-drawn carriages were replaced with the first engines.

The city, and the fire department's responsibilities, have changed much since then. Port Tampa Bay ships 52 million tons of cargo per year and handles more hazardous materials than anywhere else in Florida. Tampa International Airport serves over 10 million travelers each year, while the 75,000 seat Raymond James Stadium sees many travelers as well.

== Marine firefighting ==
The TFRD is responsible for fire suppression, search and rescue, and medical emergencies in and around Port Tampa Bay, the 7th largest port in the United States. They are also responsible for all waters of Tampa Bay as far out as Egmont Key. The Port Authority and marine division maintains two 69 foot (21 m) MetalCraft Marine vessels, a 30 foot (9.1 m) Sea Ark and 27 foot (8.2 m) Boston Whaler. In addition, Tampa Fire Rescue operates several RHIBs for use in shallow waters.

== Stations and apparatus ==
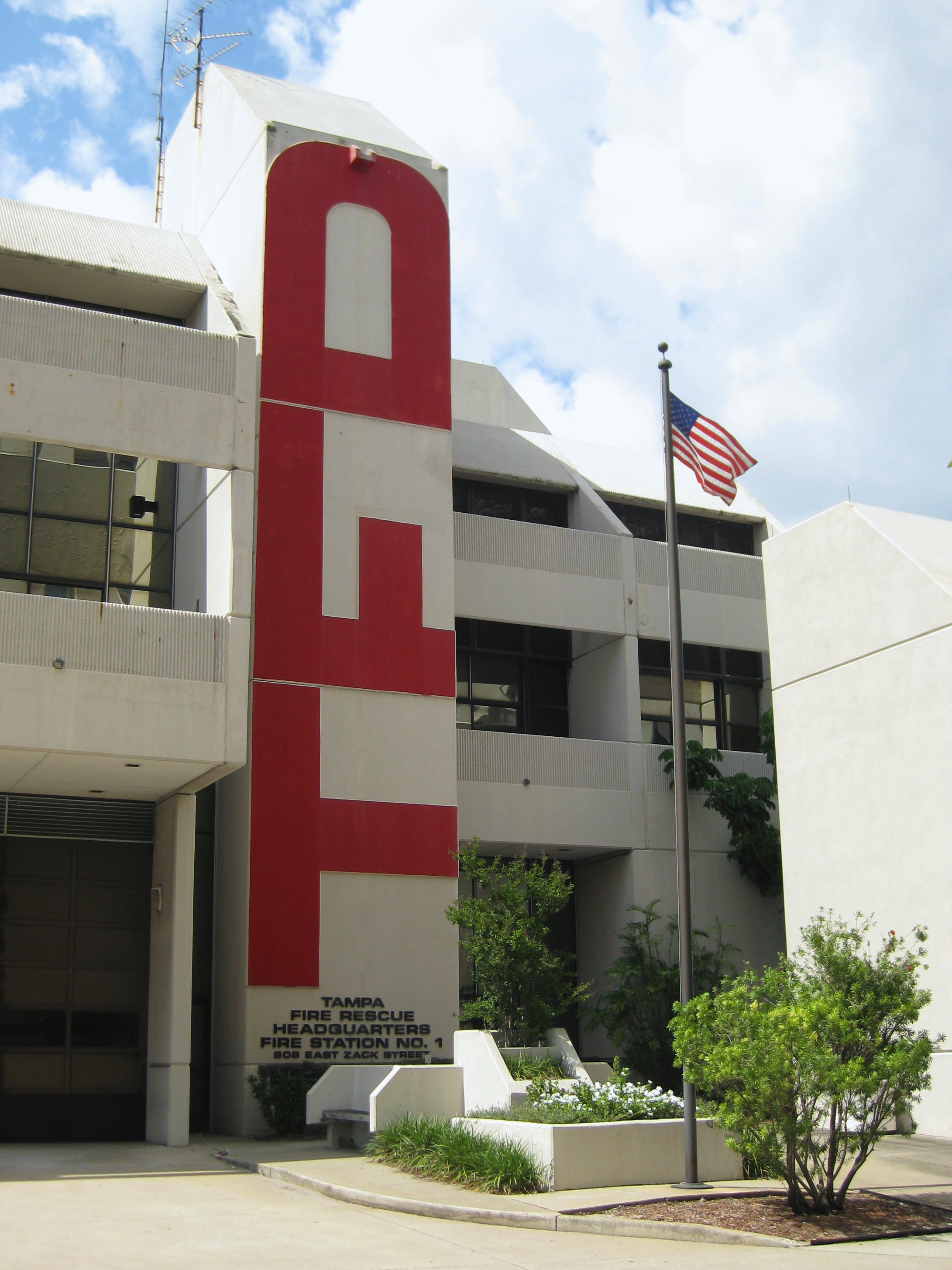
Tampa Fire Rescue Headquarters at Fire Station No. 1, built in 1974

The TFD firefighting operations are based out of the city's 23 local fire stations.

Fire station number	Fire station address	Engine company	Emergency medical services (EMS) rescue units or ARFF units	Truck company	Specialized units	Chief unit
1	808 East Zack St	Engine 1	Rescue 1	Truck 1	Heavy Rescue 1, Vent 1, Firelight 1, Tactical Support 1	District 1
2	Tampa International Airport	Engine 2	ARFF 6, 9, & 10		Crash 1, 2, 3, 4, 5, 7, 8	Chief 12
3	103 South Newport Ave	Engine 3	Rescue 3			
4	2100 East 11th Ave	Engine 4	Rescue 4		Foam 4, Foam 4X	
5	3900 North Central Ave	Engine 5	Rescue 5			
6	311 South 22nd St	Engine 6	Rescue 6		HIT 6	
7	6129 North Nebraska Ave	Engine 7	Rescue 7			
8	2015 North Manhattan Ave	Engine 8	Rescue 8			
9	2525 West Chestnut St	Engine 9	Rescue 9	Truck 9		
10	3108 North 34th St	Engine 10				
11	1500 West Waters Ave	Engine 11	Rescue 11	Truck 13		
12	3073 West Hillsborough Ave	Engine 12				District 4
13	2713 East Annie St	Engine 13, Engine 24	Rescue 13, Rescue 24			District 3
14	1325 South Church Ave	Engine 14	Rescue 14	Truck 14	Boat 14, Tactical Rescue 33	District 2
15	4919 South Himes Ave	Engine 15	Rescue 15			
16	5126 East 10th Ave	Engine 16	Rescue 16			
17	601 East Davis Blvd	Engine 17			Brush 17 & Fireboat 17	
18	5706 North 30th St	Engine 18	Rescue 18			
19	7910 Interbay Blvd	Engine 19	Rescue 19		Fireboat 19 & Brush 19	
20	16200 Bruce Downs Blvd	Engine 20	Rescue 20		Brush 20 & Fireboat 20	
21	18902 Green Pine Ln	Engine 21	Rescue 21	Truck 21	Brush 21, HR 21	District 5
22	10871 Cross Creek Blvd	Engine 22			Brush 22	
23	20770 Trout Creek Dr	Engine 23	Rescue 23	Truck 23		
25	710 E Fairbanks St		Rescue 50, Rescue 51			
