= 2007 Krems local election =

Local election in Austria

Local elections were held in Krems an der Donau on 7 October 2007. The ÖVP held its majority; while the SPÖ increased its share of votes and seats, it failed to displace the ÖVP as the largest party in the city council. In addition to ÖVP, SPÖ, FPÖ and the Grüne, three other parties stood:

- Kommunisten und Linkssozialisten (KLS, Communists and Left Socialists)
- Zahlende Öffentlichkeit contra Hochverschuldung (ZÖCH, Paying Public against High Indebtation)
- Gerechtigkeit für Krems (GFK, Justice for Krems)

The ÖVP held their 20 mandates, the SPÖ saw an increase of three for a total of 16, while the FPÖ lost one and the Greens lost two, resulting in two and one mandate, respectively. The Communists and Left Socialists held their single mandate.
