= 2007 Tynedale District Council election =

2007 UK local government election

Results of the 2007 Tynedale District Council election

Elections to Tynedale District Council were held for the final time on 3 May 2007. The whole council was up for election and the Conservative Party kept overall control of the council. The council was abolished in 2009 when Northumberland County Council became a unitary authority.

== Election result ==
Tynedale local election result 2007
Party	Seats	Gains	Losses	Net gain/loss	Seats %	Votes %	Votes	+/−
Conservative	30							
Liberal Democrats	11							
Labour	8							
Independent	3							

== Ward results ==
Acomb (1)
Party	Candidate	Votes	%	±%
Labour	Jane Caroline Wrigley	219		
Conservative	Paul Dixon	204		
Liberal Democrats	Jennifer Frances Craufurd	41		
Turnout				

Allendale (2)
Party	Candidate	Votes	%	±%
Conservative	Colin William Horncastle	451		
Conservative	Margaret Stonehouse	380		
Liberal Democrats	John Michael Womersley Williams	281		
Turnout				

Bellingham (1)
Party	Candidate	Votes	%	±%
Conservative	Frank Thomas Mattinson	324		
Liberal Democrats	Andrew Wallace Davidson	129		
Turnout				

Broomhaugh and Riding (1)
Party	Candidate	Votes	%	±%
Liberal Democrats	Philip Ronald Latham	303		
Conservative	Charles William Roland Heslop	236		
Turnout				

Chollerton with Whittington (1)
Party	Candidate	Votes	%	±%
Conservative	Edward Heslop	375		
Liberal Democrats	Daisy Louise Ford	83		
Turnout				

Corbridge (3)
Party	Candidate	Votes	%	±%
Liberal Democrats	Bill Grigg	666		
Conservative	Jean Barbara Fearon	583		
Conservative	Kate Oliver	549		
Liberal Democrats	Peter Frank Rodger	462		
Liberal Democrats	Susan Grigg	433		
Turnout				
