= 2007 Rikuzentakata mayoral election =

Rikuzentakata, Iwate, held a mayoral election on February 4, 2007. Nagato Nakasato beat incumbent mayor Akihiko Yoshida.

== Candidates ==
- Akihiko Yoshida, incumbent mayor and former city assembly member supported by the Democratic Party of Japan (DPJ)
- Nagato Nakasato, former city assembly member and candidate for the Japanese Communist Party (JCP)

== Results ==
Mayoral election 2007: Rikuzentakata City
Party	Candidate	Votes	%	±%
Independent, JCP	Nagato Nakasato	9,865		
Independent, DPJ	Akihiko Yoshida	7,341		
Turnout		17,313	82.73 %	
