= 2007 Montgomery mayoral election =

- August 28, 2007
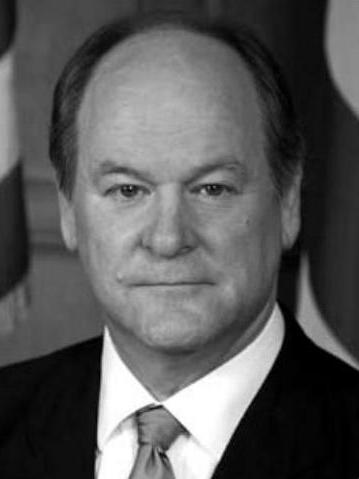

Candidate	Bobby Bright	Scott Simmons	Jon Dow
Party	nonpartisan candidate	nonpartisan candidate	nonpartisan candidate
Popular vote	22,992	13,003	2,721
Percentage	58.28%	32.98%	6.89%
Mayor before election
Bobby Bright
Independent
Elected mayor
Bobby Bright
Independent

The 2007 Montgomery mayoral election took place on August 28, 2007, to elect the Mayor of Montgomery, Alabama. It saw the reelection of incumbent mayor Bobby Bright.

The election was officially nonpartisan. Had no candidate received a majority of the vote, a runoff election would have been held between the top two candidates.

== Results ==
Results
Party	Candidate	Votes	%
Nonpartisan	Bobby Bright (incumbent)	22,992	58.28
Nonpartisan	Scott Simmons	13,003	32.98
Nonpartisan	Jon Dow	2,721	6.89
Nonpartisan	William Franklin Boy	721	1.83
Total votes		39,437	
