= 2007 Grande Prairie municipal election =

The 2007 Grande Prairie municipal election was held Monday, October 15, 2007. Since 1968, provincial legislation has required every municipality to hold triennial elections. The citizens of Grande Prairie, Alberta, elected one mayor, eight aldermen (all at large), the five Grande Prairie School District No. 2357 trustees (at large), and five of the Grande Prairie Roman Catholic Separate School District No. 28's seven trustees (as Ward 1). Of the 33,210 eligible voters, only 9,693 turned in a ballot, a voter turnout of 29.2%, and an average of 5.9 aldermen per ballot.

== Results ==
Bold indicates elected, and incumbents are italicized.

=== Mayor ===
Mayor
| Candidate | Votes | % |
|---|---|---|
| **Dwight Logan** | **6,455** | **67.6%** |
| Wayne Christopher Ayling | 3,092 | 32.4% |

=== Aldermen ===
Aldermen
| Candidate | Votes | % |
|---|---|---|
| **Bill Given** | **5,978** | **10.38%** |
| **Lorne Radbourne** | **5,637** | **9.79%** |
| **Dan Wong** | **5,607** | **9.74%** |
| **Helen A. Rice** | **4,129** | **7.17%** |
| **Gladys Mina Blackmore** | **4,017** | **6.98%** |
| **Alex Gustafson** | **3,700** | **6.43%** |
| **Yad Minhas** | **3,649** | **6.34%** |
| **Elroy Deimert** | **3,319** | **5.76%** |
| Kevin McLean | 3,284 | 5.70% |
| Margaret Heath | 3,240 | 5.63% |
| John A. Croken | 3,085 | 5.36% |
| Augustine Ebinu | 2,795 | 4.85% |
| Dave Storey | 2,662 | 4.62% |
| Lorraine Ehlert | 2,207 | 3.83% |
| Lorraine Nordstrom | 2,160 | 3.75% |
| Danny Hynes | 2,110 | 3.66% |

=== Public School Trustees ===
Grande Prairie School District No. 2357
| Candidate | Votes | % |
|---|---|---|
| **John Lehners** | **3,889** | **19.1%** |
| **Karen Prokopowich** | **3,739** | **18.4%** |
| **Paulette Kurylo** | **3,644** | **17.9%** |
| **Steven L. Shavers** | **3,291** | **16.2%** |
| **Brenda Howard** | **3,147** | **15.5%** |
| Brian Parlee | 2,653 | 13.0% |

=== Separate School Trustees ===
Unofficial

Grande Prairie Roman Catholic Separate School District No. 28
Ward 1
| Candidate | Votes | % |
|---|---|---|
| **Jennifer Wrzosek** | **1,466** | **17.81%** |
| **Alice Brick** | **1,431** | **17.39%** |
| **Laureen Lushman** | **1,419** | **17.24%** |
| **Eldon Wyant** | **1,384** | **16.82%** |
| **Ralph Wohlgemuth** | **1,381** | **16.78%** |
| Rob Allen | 1,149 | 13.96% |

=== Question ===
Special School Tax Levy
| Selection | Votes | % |
|---|---|---|
| Yes | 2,513 | 38.5% |
| **No** | **4,011** | **61.5%** |
