= 2007 European Parliament election =

Two member states of the European Union held elections to the European Parliament in 2007. For details, see

- 2007 European Parliament election in Bulgaria
- 2007 European Parliament election in Romania
