= 2007 Raleigh mayoral election =

- October 9, 2007
Candidate	Charles Meeker
Party	Democratic
Popular vote	21,089
Percentage	93.53%
Mayor before election
Charles Meeker
Democratic
Elected mayor
Charles Meeker
Democratic

The Raleigh mayoral election of 2007 was held on 9 October 2007 to elect a Mayor of Raleigh, North Carolina. It was won by Democratic incumbent Charles Meeker, who was unopposed.

== Results ==
2007 Raleigh mayoral election
Party	Candidate	Votes	%	±%
Democratic	Charles Meeker (incumbent)	21,089	93.53	
Other	Write-ins	1,460	6.47	
Turnout		22,549		
