= 2007 Stratford-on-Avon District Council election =

2007 UK local government election

Results of the 2007 Stratford-on-Avon District Council election

The 2007 Stratford-on-Avon District Council election took place on 3 May 2007 to elect members of Stratford-on-Avon District Council in Warwickshire, England. One third of the council was up for election and the Conservative Party stayed in overall control of the council.

After the election, the composition of the council was

- Conservative 37
- Liberal Democrat 14
- Independent 2

== Election result ==
The results of the election were delayed after problems with the electronic counting system led to the count being suspended and then resumed later manually. When the results were declared the Conservatives increased their majority on the council after making 5 gains among the 18 seats that were being contested.

Stratford-on-Avon local election result 2007
Party	Seats	Gains	Losses	Net gain/loss	Seats %	Votes %	Votes	+/−
Conservative	13	5	0	+5	72.2	51.9	14,982	-0.6%
Liberal Democrats	5	0	4	-4	27.8	35.6	10,282	-4.0%
Labour	0	0	0	0	0	5.5	1,573	+2.2%
Independent	0	0	1	-1	0	3.0	867	-1.0%
UKIP	0	0	0	0	0	2.3	664	+1.8%
Green	0	0	0	0	0	1.7	479	+1.7%

== Ward results ==
Alcester
Party	Candidate	Votes	%	±%
Conservative	Eric Payne	1,214	60.0	+28.9
Liberal Democrats	Karyl Rees	629	31.1	−25.6
UKIP	Ronald Mole	108	5.3	−1.3
Labour	Michael Gerrard	74	3.7	−1.9
Majority		585	28.9	
Turnout		2,025	43.7	+4.5
Conservative gain from Liberal Democrats		Swing		

Bardon
Party	Candidate	Votes	%	±%
Conservative	Valerie Hobbs	459	62.3	−2.6
Liberal Democrats	John Insoll	170	23.1	−12.0
UKIP	Michael Sharpe	108	14.7	+14.7
Majority		289	39.2	+9.3
Turnout		737	42.2	−0.8
Conservative hold		Swing		

Bidford and Salford
Party	Candidate	Votes	%	±%
Conservative	Brian Slaughter	1,028	50.7	+5.9
Liberal Democrats	Melanie Holland	738	36.4	−18.8
Labour	Alec Brown	155	7.6	+7.6
Green	Karen Varga	108	5.3	+5.3
Majority		290	14.3	
Turnout		2,029	38.2	+5.4
Conservative hold		Swing		

Fenny Compton
Party	Candidate	Votes	%	±%
Conservative	Christopher Williams	642	69.9	+2.9
Liberal Democrats	Nesta Commander	277	30.1	−2.9
Majority		365	39.7	+5.7
Turnout		919	48.9	+8.2
Conservative hold		Swing		

Harbury
Party	Candidate	Votes	%	±%
Conservative	Peter Barton	921	56.5	+14.5
Liberal Democrats	Christopher Moir	709	43.5	−14.5
Majority		212	13.0	
Turnout		1,630	43.4	+0.2
Conservative hold		Swing		

Henley
Party	Candidate	Votes	%	±%
Conservative	Laurence Marshall	1,252	76.9	+0.8
UKIP	Brett Parsons	134	8.2	+8.2
Liberal Democrats	Rosemary Ratcliffe	126	7.7	−16.2
Labour	Jacqueline Abbott	116	7.1	+7.1
Majority		1,118	68.7	+16.4
Turnout		1,628	46.2	+3.4
Conservative hold		Swing		

Kineton
Party	Candidate	Votes	%	±%
Conservative	Christopher Mills	913	59.1	+18.0
Liberal Democrats	Lou Giblin	631	40.9	−18.0
Majority		282	18.3	
Turnout		1,544	46.0	−1.2
Conservative gain from Liberal Democrats		Swing		

Shipston
Party	Candidate	Votes	%	±%
Liberal Democrats	Bob White	952	49.2	+2.8
Conservative	Clive Faulkner	901	46.5	−7.1
Labour	Ann Grosvenor	83	4.3	+4.3
Majority		51	2.6	
Turnout		1,936	49.3	+4.0
Liberal Democrats hold		Swing		

Southam
Party	Candidate	Votes	%	±%
Conservative	David Wise	975	56.8	+8.4
Labour	Jim Taylor	555	32.3	+4.3
Liberal Democrats	Ian Fradgley	187	10.9	−12.7
Majority		420	24.5	+4.0
Turnout		1,717	34.6	+0.5
Conservative hold		Swing		

Stockton and Napton
Party	Candidate	Votes	%	±%
Liberal Democrats	Nigel Rock	unopposed		
Liberal Democrats hold		Swing		

Stratford Alveston
Party	Candidate	Votes	%	±%
Conservative	Vince Seaman	1,172	48.6	−3.4
Liberal Democrats	Kate Rolfe	935	38.8	−9.2
UKIP	Ralph Berry	190	7.9	+7.9
Green	John Mullings	115	4.8	+4.8
Majority		237	9.8	+5.8
Turnout		2,412	46.6	+0.6
Conservative hold		Swing		

Stratford Avenue and New Town
Party	Candidate	Votes	%	±%
Conservative	Alison Gardner	899	38.9	+10.1
Independent	Keith Lloyd	867	37.5	+13.4
Liberal Democrats	Ron Tredwell	407	17.6	−23.3
Labour	Karen Parnell	140	6.1	−0.1
Majority		32	1.4	
Turnout		2,313	43.0	+2.2
Conservative gain from Independent		Swing		

Stratford Guild and Hathaway
Party	Candidate	Votes	%	±%
Conservative	Neville Beamer	1,272	50.4	+13.4
Liberal Democrats	Clive Thomas	783	31.0	−21.3
Labour	George Hathaway	194	7.7	+7.7
Green	Hugh Chatwin	150	5.9	+5.9
UKIP	Harry Cottam	124	4.9	+4.9
Majority		489	19.4	
Turnout		2,523	44.4	+5.0
Conservative gain from Liberal Democrats		Swing		

Stratford Mount Pleasant
Party	Candidate	Votes	%	±%
Liberal Democrats	Peter Moorse	910	68.1	+5.2
Conservative	John Brain	310	23.2	−6.7
Labour	David Talbot	116	8.7	+1.5
Majority		600	44.9	+11.8
Turnout		1,336	40.1	+3.7
Liberal Democrats hold		Swing		

Studley
Party	Candidate	Votes	%	±%
Conservative	Mike Weddell	893	48.5	+6.7
Liberal Democrats	Tony Cronin	809	43.9	−14.3
Labour	Jeffrey Kenner	140	7.6	+7.6
Majority		84	4.6	
Turnout		1,842	40.6	+1.5
Conservative gain from Liberal Democrats		Swing		

Tredington
Party	Candidate	Votes	%	±%
Conservative	Christopher Saint	665	73.6	+5.0
Liberal Democrats	Philip Vial	239	26.4	−5.0
Majority		426	47.1	+10.0
Turnout		904	47.6	+4.4
Conservative hold		Swing		

Welford
Party	Candidate	Votes	%	±%
Liberal Democrats	Peter Barnes	584	54.6	−22.1
Conservative	David Cox	486	45.4	+22.1
Majority		98	9.2	−44.3
Turnout		1,070	64.3	+12.4
Liberal Democrats hold		Swing		

Wellesbourne
Party	Candidate	Votes	%	±%
Liberal Democrats	David Close	1,196	52.4	
Conservative	Martyn Allan	980	42.9	
Green	Roger Fisher	106	4.6	
Majority		216	9.5	
Turnout		2,282	43.5	
Liberal Democrats hold		Swing		
