= 2007 Higashiōsaka city assembly election =

Local election in Japan

Higashiōsaka, Osaka held an election for the city assembly on September 23, 2007. The right-wing parties Liberal Democratic Party of Japan and New Komeito won a majority. The Japanese Communist Party emerged as the biggest opposition party.

== Issues ==
The major issue was the no-confidence vote towards mayor Junzō Nagao, a member of the Japanese Communist Party. Submitted shortly before the election it will force a mayoral election on October 23.

== Results ==
The results showed an increase of the vote for the Japanese Communist Party with almost 10,000 votes since last election and all nine candidates was elected. The LDP lost two seats, as did the New Komeito.

Summary of the September 23, 2007 Higashiōsaka City Assembly election results
Parties	Votes	%	Seats
Liberal Democratic Party of Japan (自由民主党, Jiyū Minshutō)	49,979		16
New Komeito Party (公明党, Kōmeitō)	44,488		12
Japanese Communist Party (日本共産党, Nihon Kyōsan-tō)	40,725		9
Democratic Party of Japan (民主党, Minshutō)	12,132		4
New Socialist Party (新社会, Shin Shakai-tō)	2,941		1
Independents	12,118		4
Total (turnout 45.48%)	180,388	100.00	46
