= 2007 Thurrock Council election =

2007 UK local government election

Results of the 2007 Thurrock Council election

The 2007 Thurrock Council election took place on 3 May 2007 to elect members of Thurrock Council in Essex, England. One third of the council was up for election and the Conservative Party lost overall control of the council to no overall control.

The Conservatives, Labour and British National Party (BNP) contested all 16 wards which were up for election. In total 55 candidates stood in the election including 6 Liberal Democrats, 3 from the United Kingdom Independence Party, 2 independents and 1 candidate from the Independent Working Class Association. Anti-social behaviour, recycling and cleanliness were seen as major issues by the parties, on a council which was seen as a top Labour target.

The British National Party put up candidates in every ward, for the first time. However, they secured no seats despite claiming that they were picking up votes from right wing Conservative supporters disaffected with David Cameron, particularly in middle class areas. In the West Thurrock and South Stifford ward, Ken Daly stood for the BNP in protest at the treatment of his son's killer.

The results of the election saw the Conservatives lose their overall majority on the council after losing 3 seats and only gaining one. The Labour Party made a net gain of two seats, while the BNP came second in 6 seats after a strong rise in votes. Overall turnout was 31% and after the election the balance of power on the council was held by 3 independents.

After the election, the composition of the council was:

- Conservative 24
- Labour 22
- Independent 3

== Election results ==
Thurrock local election result 2007
Party	Seats	Gains	Losses	Net gain/loss	Seats %	Votes %	Votes	+/−
Labour	8	3	1	+2	50.0	34.1	9,920	-1.8
Conservative	7	1	3	-2	43.8	30.7	8,934	-10.6
Independent	1	0	0	0	6.3	4.2	1,226	+2.3
BNP	0	0	0	0	0.0	24.6	7,149	+12.6
Liberal Democrats	0	0	0	0	0.0	4.0	1,187	-3.1
UKIP	0	0	0	0	0.0	1.7	507	+1.7
Ind. Working Class	0	0	0	0	0.0	0.5	144	+0.5

== Ward results ==
Aveley & Uplands
Party	Candidate	Votes	%	±%
Conservative	John Cowell	671	37.0	−14.6
BNP	John Cotter	562	31.0	+31.0
Labour	Martin Healy	436	24.0	−3.9
Liberal Democrats	John Livermore	146	8.0	−1.5
Majority		109	6.0	−17.7
Turnout		1,815	28.0	−0.8
Conservative hold		Swing		

Belhus
Party	Candidate	Votes	%	±%
Labour	Charles Curtis	645	36.0	−5.5
Conservative	Billy Taylor	618	34.5	+6.0
BNP	David Strickson	407	22.7	−7.3
Liberal Democrats	John Biddall	121	6.8	+6.8
Majority		27	1.5	−10.0
Turnout		1,791	27.1	+0.5
Labour hold		Swing		

Chadwell St. Mary
Party	Candidate	Votes	%	±%
Labour	Anthony Fish	973	43.3	+4.8
BNP	Bryn Robinson	738	32.8	+8.0
Conservative	Lee Dove	395	17.6	−9.3
Liberal Democrats	Arthur Bowles	141	6.3	−3.5
Majority		235	10.5	−1.1
Turnout		2,247	31.0	−2.6
Labour hold		Swing		

Chafford & North Stifford
Party	Candidate	Votes	%	±%
Conservative	Neil Rockliffe	564	36.5	
Liberal Democrats	Earnshaw Palmer	447	28.9	
Labour	Grant Smith	233	15.1	
BNP	Donna Stickson	228	14.8	
UKIP	Alan Broad	73	4.7	
Majority		117	7.6	
Turnout		1,545	28.7	+0.7
Conservative hold		Swing		

Corringham & Fobbing
Party	Candidate	Votes	%	±%
Conservative	Anne Cheale	734	41.5	
Labour	John Cecil	565	32.0	
BNP	Warren Parish	469	26.5	
Majority		169	9.5	
Turnout		1,768	39.7	+3.6
Conservative hold		Swing		

East Tilbury
Party	Candidate	Votes	%	±%
Independent	John Purkiss	957	66.3	
BNP	Linda Geri	350	24.2	
Labour	Manuel Sanwo	137	9.5	
Majority		607	42.1	
Turnout		1,444	30.8	−4.3
Independent hold		Swing		

Grays Riverside
Party	Candidate	Votes	%	±%
Labour	Valerie Morris-Cook	741	43.7	+0.1
BNP	Rob Maloney	436	25.7	−2.1
Conservative	Priscillar Wren	352	20.7	−7.9
Liberal Democrats	William Jackson	168	9.9	+9.9
Majority		305	18.0	+3.0
Turnout		1,697	23.2	−1.9
Labour hold		Swing		

Grays Thurrock
Party	Candidate	Votes	%	±%
Labour	Catherine Kent	1,034	48.5	+6.5
Conservative	Amanda Redsell	570	26.7	−10.6
BNP	Rickey Strickson	530	24.8	+7.3
Majority		464	21.8	+17.1
Turnout		2,134	33.6	−3.4
Labour hold		Swing		

Little Thurrock Rectory
Party	Candidate	Votes	%	±%
Conservative	Stuart St.Clair-Haslam	566	38.3	−30.0
Labour	John-Paul Garner	430	29.1	−2.6
BNP	Terry Gowen	318	21.5	+21.5
Liberal Democrats	Thomas Kelly	164	11.1	+11.1
Majority		136	9.2	−27.4
Turnout		1,478	32.7	+0.6
Conservative hold		Swing		

Ockendon
Party	Candidate	Votes	%	±%
Conservative	Barry Johnson	728	34.8	−4.2
Labour	Oliver Gerrish	714	34.1	−11.1
BNP	Mark Gorman	434	20.7	+20.7
UKIP	Matthew Knowles	218	10.4	+10.4
Majority		14	0.7	
Turnout		2,094	31.1	+0.5
Conservative hold		Swing		

Stanford East & Corringham Town
Party	Candidate	Votes	%	±%
Labour	Roisin O'Reilly	905	37.7	−2.5
Conservative	Hazel Daniels	844	35.2	−1.1
BNP	Christopher Roberts	505	21.1	−2.4
Ind. Working Class	David Amis	144	6.0	+6.0
Majority		61	2.5	−1.4
Turnout		2,398	36.8	+0.8
Labour gain from Conservative		Swing		

Stanford-Le-Hope West
Party	Candidate	Votes	%	±%
Conservative	Edward Hardiman	587	39.7	
Labour	Gerard Rice	409	27.7	
BNP	Lauren Kay	266	18.0	
UKIP	Clive Broad	216	14.6	
Majority		178	12.0	
Turnout		1,478	31.2	+1.6
Conservative hold		Swing		

Stifford Clays
Party	Candidate	Votes	%	±%
Labour	Diana Hale	762	41.7	+0.3
Conservative	Leopoldo Milan-Vega	632	34.6	−8.6
BNP	Angela Daly	435	23.8	+23.8
Majority		130	7.1	
Turnout		1,829	38.3	−2.6
Labour gain from Conservative		Swing		

The Homesteads
Party	Candidate	Votes	%	±%
Conservative	Pauline Tolson	1,077	41.3	−1.4
Labour	Salvatore Benson	877	33.7	−0.9
BNP	Paul Woodley	652	25.0	+25.0
Majority		200	7.6	−0.5
Turnout		2,606	39.0	+1.8
Conservative gain from Labour		Swing		

Tilbury Riverside & Thurrock Park
Party	Candidate	Votes	%	±%
Labour	Paul Attah	383	33.9	−2.7
BNP	Nicholas Geri	341	30.2	+30.2
Independent	June Brown	269	23.8	−8.4
Conservative	Paul Coutts	137	12.1	−19.2
Majority		42	3.7	−0.7
Turnout		1,131	25.0	−0.4
Labour hold		Swing		

West Thurrock & South Stifford
Party	Candidate	Votes	%	±%
Labour	Julieann Burkey	676	41.9	+5.5
BNP	Kenneth Daly	478	29.6	−5.8
Conservative	Georgette Polley	459	28.5	+0.3
Majority		198	12.3	+11.3
Turnout		1,613	26.6	−2.3
Labour gain from Conservative		Swing		
