= 2007 Wallis and Futuna Territorial Assembly election =

Territorial Assembly elections were held in Wallis and Futuna on 1 April 2007. Of the twenty-six lists contesting the election, twenty won one seat each in an election that has been described as "having elected members along mainly clan lines". Three new members were elected, and turnout was 71 per cent.

The new president of the Territorial Assembly should have been chosen on 6 April 2007, but this was delayed until 11 April 2007 due to bad weather. On that date, Pesamino Taputai was elected with 12 votes in favour.

== Results ==
| Party | Seats |
|---|---|
| Right-leaning lists (UMP, Modem and others) | 12 |
| Left-leaning lists (PS and others) | 8 |
| Total | 20 |
