= 2007 Warabi city assembly election =

Local election in Japan

Warabi, Saitama held a local election to the city assembly on June 3, 2007. The election was dominated by independents while the Japanese Communist Party gained most seats of the parties. Notable is the Liberal Democratic Party did not contest with official candidates.

== Results ==
Summary of the June 3, 2007 Warabi City Assembly election results
Parties	Votes	%	Seats
Japanese Communist Party (日本共産党, Nihon Kyōsan-tō)	5,971		4
New Komeito Party (公明党, Kōmeitō)	4,422		3
Democratic Party of Japan (民主党, Minshutō)	2,939		2
Independents	14,102		9
Total (turnout 59.23%)	33,126	100.00	18
Source: JanJan
