= 2007 Mukō city assembly election =

Local election in Japan

Mukō, Kyoto Prefecture held an election for the city assembly on August 5, 2007. 24 seats where contested by 25 candidates.

== Results ==
Summary of the August 5, 2007 Mukō City Assembly election results
| Parties | Votes | % | Seats |
|---|---|---|---|
| Japanese Communist Party (日本共産党, Nihon Kyōsan-tō) | 6,446 | | 8 |
| New Komeito Party (公明党, Kōmeitō) | 2,269 | | 3 |
| Democratic Party of Japan (民主党, Minshutō) | 2,428 | | 2 |
| Liberal Democratic Party (自由民主党, Jiyū Minshutō) | 1,151 | | 1 |
| Social Democratic Party (社民党 Shamin-tō) | 878 | | 1 |
| Independents | 7,527 | | 9 |
| Total (turnout 48.44 %) | 21,347 | 100.00 | 24 |
Source:go2senkyo
