= 2007 Shinagawa city assembly election =

Local elecion in Japan

The local election for city assembly of Shinagawa, Tokyo, Japan was held on April 15, 2007. The total turnout was 41.59%.

== Results ==
Summary of the April 15, 2007 Shinagawa City Assembly election results
Parties	Votes	%	Seats
Liberal Democratic Party (自由民主党, Jiyū Minshutō)	26,078.068		11
New Komeito Party (公明党, Kōmeitō)	21,544.887		8
Japanese Communist Party (日本共産党, Nihon Kyōsan-tō)	17,975.874		7
Democratic Party of Japan (民主党, Minshutō)	17,806.445		5
品川・生活者ネットワーク	3,550		2
Social Democratic Party (社民党 Shamin-tō)	1,735		1
Independents	14,531		6
Total (turnout 41.59%)	N/A	100.00	40
