= 2007 United Kingdom local elections =

- 3 May 2007

All 36 metropolitan boroughs, 45 out of 46 unitary authorities, 231 out of 238 English districts, all 32 Scottish council areas, and 3 directly elected mayors
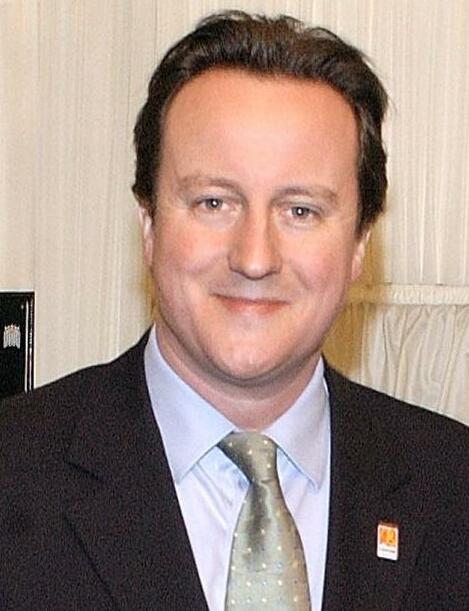

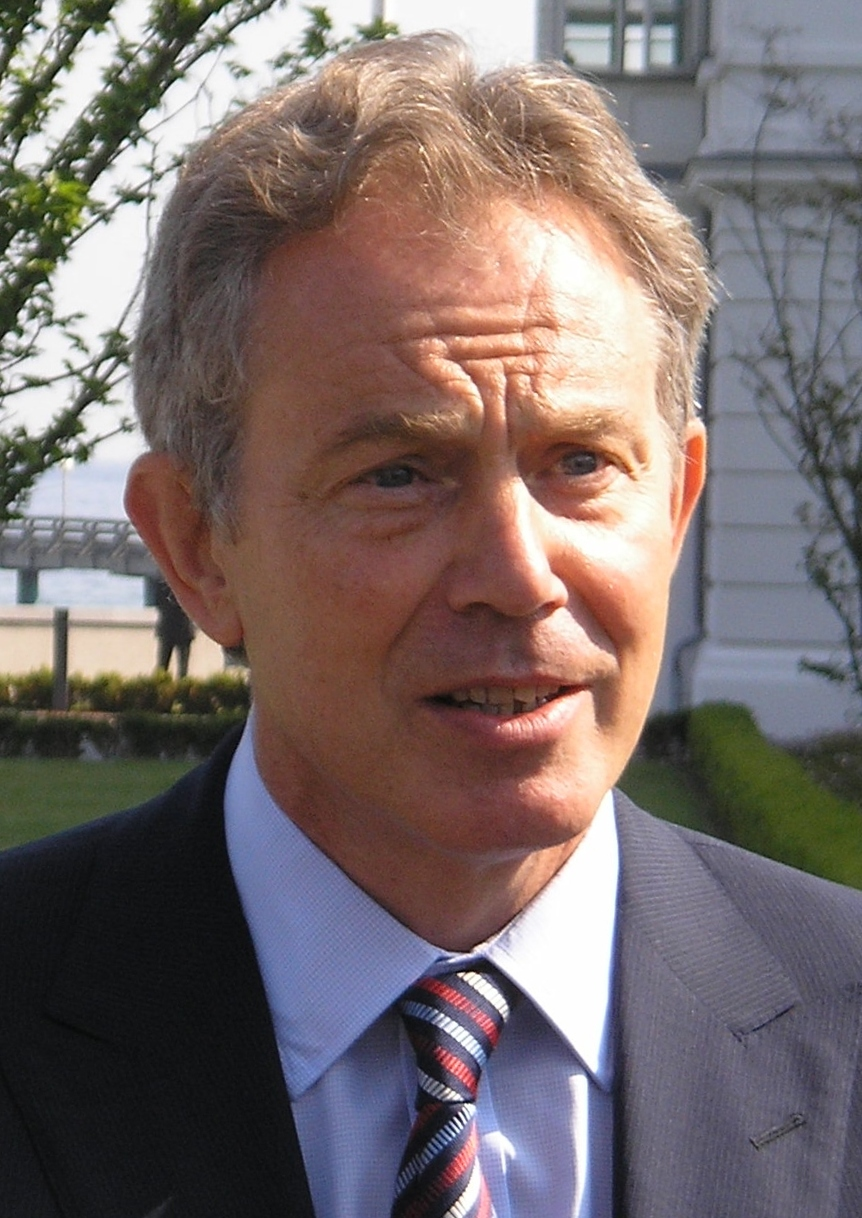

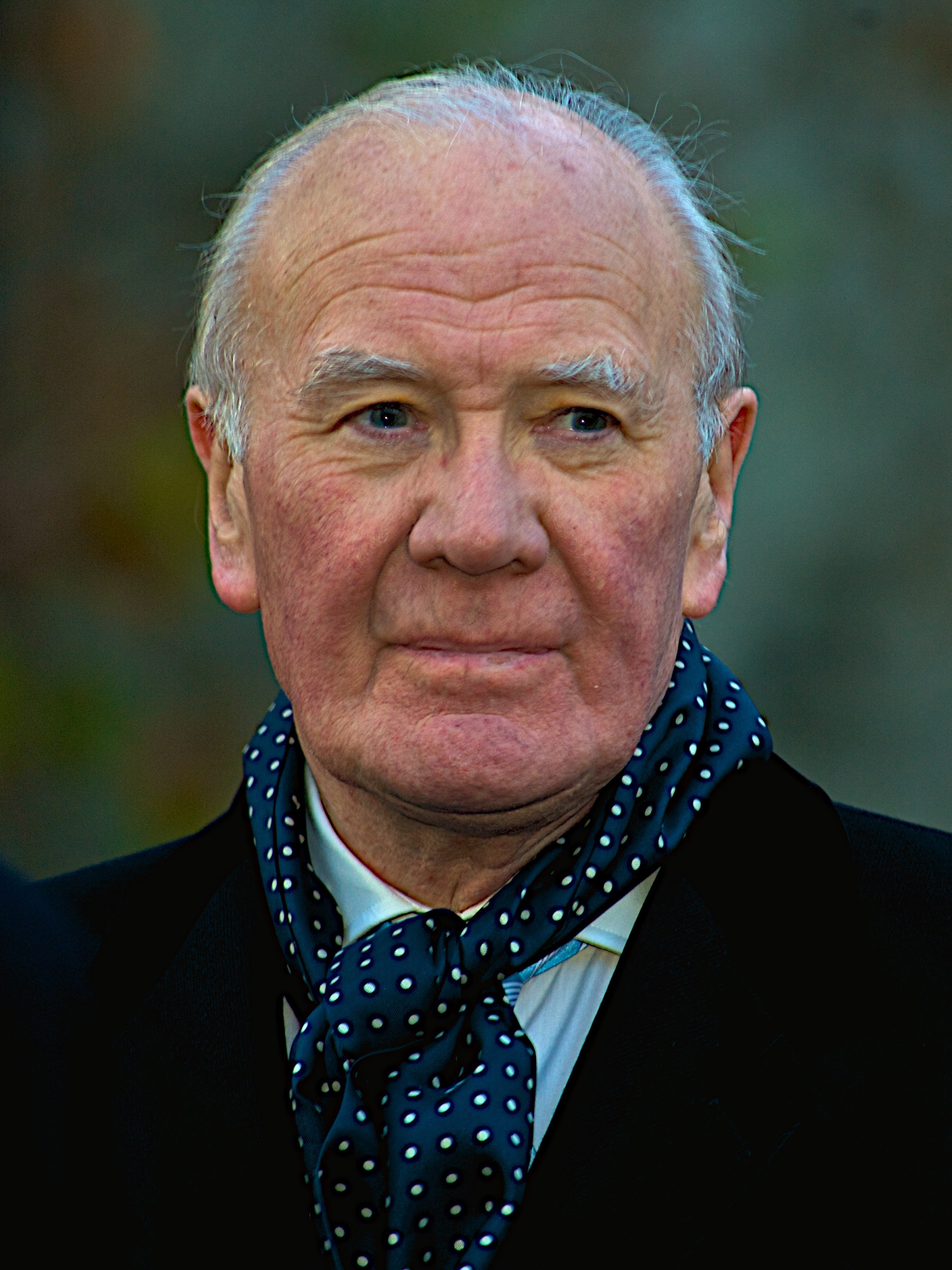
	First party	Second party	Third party
Leader	David Cameron	Tony Blair	Menzies Campbell
Party	Conservative	Labour	Liberal Democrats
Leader since	6 December 2005	21 July 1994	2 March 2006
Percentage	40%	27%	26%
Swing	▲1%	▲1%	▲1%
Councils	165	36	23
Councils +/-	▲39	▼18	▼4
Councillors	5,458	2,225	2,337
Councillors +/-	▲932	▼665	▼255
- Colours denote the winning party, as shown in the main table of results.

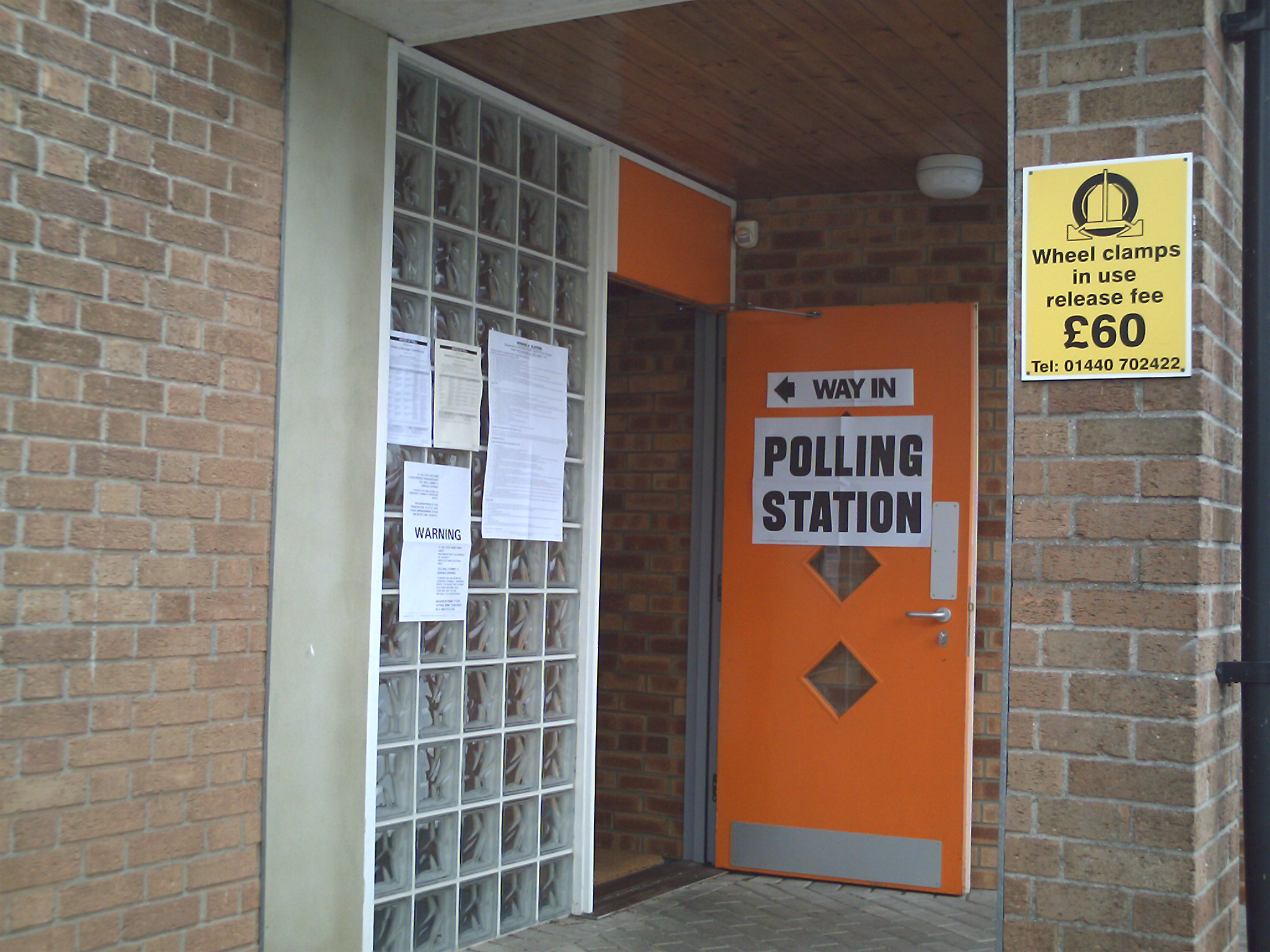
Entrance to a polling station in the market town of Haverhill, Suffolk on 3 May 2007. The posters on the left are lists of the candidates in wards contested (St Edmundsbury BC and Haverhill TC) and information about rules and laws about voting.

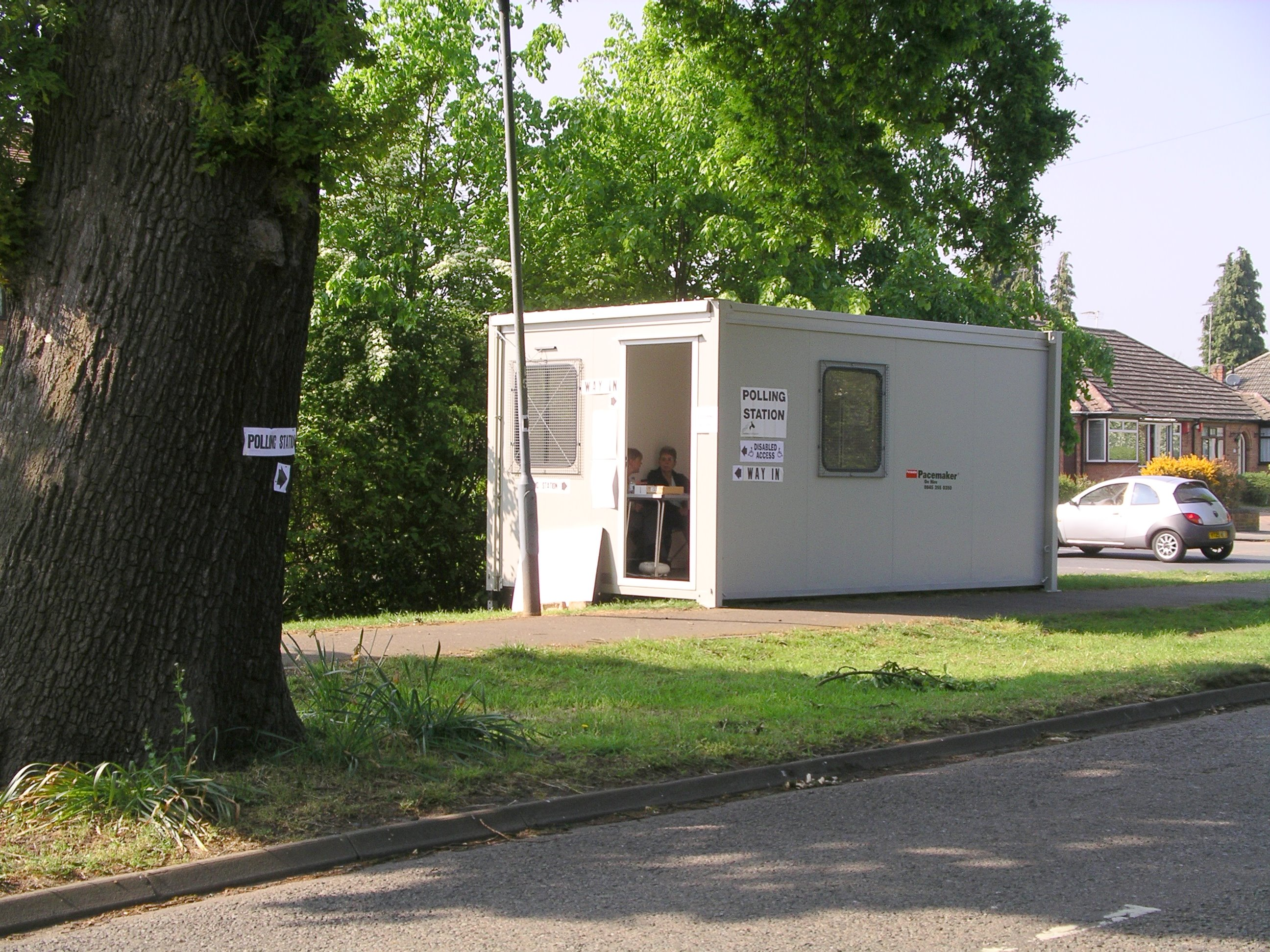
A polling station in a temporary cabin in position in the South of Coventry for the UK council elections on 3 May 2007.

The 2007 United Kingdom local elections were held on Thursday 3 May 2007. These elections took place in most of England and all of Scotland. There were no local government elections in Wales though the Welsh Assembly had a general election on the same day. There were no local government elections in Northern Ireland. Just over half of English councils and almost all the Scottish councils began the counts on Friday, rather than Thursday night, because of more complex arrangements regarding postal votes.

These elections were a landmark in the United Kingdom as it was the first time that 18- to 20-year-olds could stand as candidates for council seats. The change was due to an alteration of the Electoral Administration Act. At least fourteen 18- to 20-year-olds are known to have stood as candidates for council seats and as a result William Lloyd became the youngest person to be elected to official office in Britain. There were also a number of councils which used new voting methods such as internet and telephone voting in addition to the traditional methods of polling stations and postal votes.

These were the final elections to be overseen by Labour leader and prime minister Tony Blair, who resigned the following month after a decade as prime minister to be succeeded by chancellor Gordon Brown. His party only finished in second place with a narrow lead over the third-placed Liberal Democrats, whose leader Menzies Campbell would also resign later in the year, while it was a strong showing for the Conservatives under David Cameron.

== Results ==
There was a suggestion in February 2006 that many of the 2007 local elections in England would be cancelled due to a reform of local government. However, since then possible reforms are still in the consultation stage and no decisions have yet been made.

312 English district councils, nearly all districts in England held some form of election – either thirds or full – on Thursday, 3 May 2007.

The final results are summarised below; firstly, with a table ranked by the party with the greatest number of councillors elected.

Party	Councils		Councillors	
Party	Number	Change	Number	Change
Conservative	165	▲39	5,458	▲932
Liberal Democrats	23	▼4	2,337	▼255
Labour	36	▼18	2,225	▼665
SNP	0	▼1	363	▲182
Residents	1	Steady	67	▼19
Green	0	Steady	62	▲17
BNP	0	Steady	10	▲1
Liberal	0	Steady	9	▼1
Green	0	Steady	8	▲8
Mebyon Kernow	0	Steady	7	▲1
UKIP	0	Steady	5	▼1
Health Concern	0	Steady	4	▲1
Respect	0	Steady	3	Steady
Solidarity	0	Steady	1	▲1
Scottish Socialist	0	Steady	0	▼1
Socialist	0	Steady	0	▼1
Other	4	Steady	949	▼162
No overall control	85	▼27	n/a	n/a

Source BBC BBC NEWS | Politics | Vote 2007 | English councils map

== England ==
All 36 English Metropolitan borough councils had one third of their seats up for election.

Council	Previous control	Result	Details
Barnsley	Labour	Labour hold	Details
Birmingham	No overall control	No overall control hold	Details
Bolton	No overall control	No overall control hold	Details
Bradford	No overall control	No overall control hold	Details
Bury	No overall control	No overall control hold	Details
Calderdale	No overall control	No overall control hold	Details
Coventry	Conservative	Conservative hold	Details
Doncaster	No overall control	No overall control hold	Details
Dudley	Conservative	Conservative hold	Details
Gateshead	Labour	Labour hold	Details
Kirklees	No overall control	No overall control hold	Details
Knowsley	Labour	Labour hold	Details
Leeds	No overall control	No overall control hold	Details
Liverpool	Liberal Democrats	Liberal Democrats hold	Details
Manchester	Labour	Labour hold	Details
Newcastle upon Tyne	Liberal Democrats	Liberal Democrats hold	Details
North Tyneside	No overall control	No overall control hold	Details
Oldham	Labour	No overall control	Details
Rochdale	No overall control	Liberal Democrats gain	Details
Rotherham	Labour	Labour hold	Details
Salford	Labour	Labour hold	Details
Sandwell	Labour	Labour hold	Details
Sefton	No overall control	No overall control hold	Details
Sheffield	Labour	No overall control gain	Details
Solihull	Conservative	No overall control gain	Details
South Tyneside	Labour	Labour hold	Details
St Helens	No overall control	No overall control hold	Details
Stockport	Liberal Democrats	Liberal Democrats hold	Details
Sunderland	Labour	Labour hold	Details
Tameside	Labour	Labour hold	Details
Trafford	Conservative	Conservative hold	Details
Wakefield	Labour	Labour hold	Details
Walsall	Conservative	Conservative hold	Details
Wigan	Labour	Labour hold	Details
Wirral	No overall control	No overall control hold	Details
Wolverhampton	Labour	Labour hold	Details

=== Whole council ===
In 25 English unitary authorities the whole council was up for election.

Council	Previous control	Result	Details
Bath and North East Somerset	No overall control	No overall control hold	Details
Blackpool	Labour	Conservative gain	Details
Bournemouth	Liberal Democrats	Conservative gain	Details
Bracknell Forest	Conservative	Conservative hold	Details
Brighton & Hove	No overall control	No overall control hold	Details
Darlington	Labour	Labour hold	Details
East Riding of Yorkshire	No overall control	Conservative gain	Details
Herefordshire	No overall control	Conservative gain	Details
Leicester	No overall control	Labour gain	Details
Luton	No overall control	Labour gain	Details
Medway	Conservative	Conservative hold	Details
Middlesbrough	Labour	Labour hold	Details
North Lincolnshire	Conservative	Labour gain	Details
North Somerset	No overall control	Conservative gain	Details
Nottingham	Labour	Labour hold	Details
Poole	Conservative	Conservative hold	Details
Redcar and Cleveland	No overall control	No overall control hold	Details
Rutland	Conservative	Conservative hold	Details
South Gloucestershire	No overall control	No overall control hold	Details
Stockton-on-Tees	No overall control	No overall control hold	Details
Telford and Wrekin	No overall control	No overall control hold	Details
Torbay	Liberal Democrats	Conservative gain	Details
West Berkshire	Conservative	Conservative hold	Details
Windsor and Maidenhead	Liberal Democrats	Conservative gain	Details
York	Liberal Democrats	No overall control gain	Details

=== Third of council ===
In 20 English unitary authorities one third of the council was up for election.

Council	Previous control	Result	Details
Blackburn with Darwen	Labour	No overall control gain	Details
Bristol	No overall control	No overall control hold	Details
Derby	No overall control	No overall control hold	Details
Halton	Labour	Labour hold	Details
Hartlepool	Labour	Labour hold	Details
Kingston upon Hull	No overall control	Liberal Democrats gain	Details
Milton Keynes	No overall control	No overall control hold	Details
North East Lincolnshire	No overall control	No overall control hold	Details
Peterborough	Conservative	Conservative hold	Details
Plymouth	No overall control	Conservative gain	Details
Portsmouth	No overall control	No overall control hold	Details
Reading	Labour	Labour hold	Details
Slough	No overall control	No overall control hold	Details
Southampton	No overall control	No overall control hold	Details
Southend-on-Sea	Conservative	Conservative hold	Details
Stoke-on-Trent	No overall control	No overall control hold	Details
Swindon	Conservative	Conservative hold	Details
Thurrock	Conservative	No overall control	Details
Warrington	No overall control	No overall control hold	Details
Wokingham	Conservative	Conservative hold	Details

== District councils ==
=== Whole council ===
In 153 English district authorities the whole council was up for election.

Council	Previous control	Result	Details
Allerdale	No overall control	No overall control hold	Details
Alnwick	No overall control	No overall control hold	Details
Arun	Conservative	Conservative hold	Details
Ashfield	Labour	No overall control	Details
Ashford	Conservative	Conservative hold	Details
Aylesbury Vale	Conservative	Conservative hold	Details
Babergh	No overall control	No overall control hold	Details
Berwick-upon-Tweed	No overall control	No overall control hold	Details
Blaby	Conservative	Conservative hold	Details
Blyth Valley	Labour	Labour hold	Details
Bolsover	Labour	Labour hold	Details
Boston	No overall control	Boston Bypass Independents gain	Details
Braintree	No overall control	Conservative gain	Details
Breckland	Conservative	Conservative hold	Details
Bridgnorth	No overall control	No overall control hold	Details
Broadland	Conservative	Conservative hold	Details
Bromsgrove	Conservative	Conservative hold	Details
Broxtowe	No overall control	No overall control hold	Details
Canterbury	No overall control	Conservative gain	Details
Caradon	No overall control	Liberal Democrats gain	Details
Carrick	Liberal Democrats	No overall control	Details
Castle Morpeth	No overall control	No overall control hold	Details
Charnwood	No overall control	Conservative gain	Details
Chelmsford	Conservative	Conservative hold	Details
Chester-le-Street	Labour	Labour hold	Details
Chesterfield	Liberal Democrats	Liberal Democrats hold	Details
Chichester	Conservative	Conservative hold	Details
Chiltern	Conservative	Conservative hold	Details
Christchurch	Conservative	Conservative hold	Details
Copeland	Labour	Labour hold	Details
Corby	Labour	Labour hold	Details
Cotswold	Conservative	Conservative hold	Details
Dacorum	Conservative	Conservative hold	Details
Dartford	No overall control	Conservative gain	Details
Derbyshire Dales	Conservative	Conservative hold	Details
Derwentside	Labour	Labour hold	Details
Dover	No overall control	Conservative gain	Details
Durham	Liberal Democrats	Liberal Democrats hold	
Easington	Labour	Labour hold	Details
Eastbourne	Conservative	Liberal Democrats gain	Details
East Cambridgeshire	No overall control	Conservative gain	Details
East Devon	Conservative	Conservative hold	Details
East Dorset	Conservative	Conservative hold	Details
East Hampshire	Conservative	Conservative hold	Details
East Hertfordshire	Conservative	Conservative hold	Details
East Lindsey	No overall control	No overall control hold	Details
East Northamptonshire	Conservative	Conservative hold	Details
East Staffordshire	Conservative	Conservative hold	Details
Eden	Independent	No overall control	Details
Epsom and Ewell	Residents Association	Residents Association hold	Details
Erewash	No overall control	Conservative gain	Details
Fenland	Conservative	Conservative hold	Details
Forest Heath	Conservative	Conservative hold	Details
Forest of Dean	No overall control	Conservative gain	Details
Fylde	Conservative	Conservative hold	Details
Gedling	No overall control	Conservative gain	Details
Gravesham	Labour	Conservative gain	Details
Guildford	Conservative	Conservative hold	Details
Hambleton	Conservative	Conservative hold	Details
Harborough	No overall control	Conservative gain	Details
High Peak	No overall control	Conservative gain	Details
Hinckley and Bosworth	Conservative	Liberal Democrats gain	Details
Horsham	Conservative	Conservative hold	Details
Kennet	Conservative	Conservative hold	Details
Kerrier	Independent	No overall control	Details
Kettering	Conservative	Conservative hold	Details
King's Lynn and West Norfolk	Conservative	Conservative hold	Details
Lancaster	No overall control	No overall control hold	Details
Lewes	Liberal Democrats	Liberal Democrats hold	Details
Lichfield	Conservative	Conservative hold	Details
Lincoln	Labour	Conservative gain	Details
Maldon	Conservative	Conservative hold	Details
Malvern Hills	No overall control	Conservative gain	Details
Mansfield	Independent	Independent hold	Details
Melton	Conservative	Conservative hold	Details
Mendip	Conservative	Conservative hold	Details
Mid Bedfordshire	Conservative	Conservative hold	Details
Mid Devon	No overall control	No overall control hold	Details
Mid Suffolk	No overall control	Conservative gain	Details
Mid Sussex	No overall control	Conservative gain	Details
New Forest	Conservative	Conservative hold	Details
Newark and Sherwood	No overall control	Conservative gain	Details
North Cornwall	No overall control	No overall control hold	Details
North Devon	Liberal Democrats	Conservative gain	Details
North Dorset	No overall control	Conservative gain	Details
North East Derbyshire	Labour	Labour hold	Details
North Hertfordshire	Conservative	Conservative hold	Details
North Kesteven	No overall control	Conservative gain	Details
North Norfolk	Liberal Democrats	Liberal Democrats hold	Details
North Shropshire	No overall control	Conservative gain	Details
North Warwickshire	No overall control	Conservative gain	Details
North West Leicestershire	Labour	Conservative gain	Details
North Wiltshire	No overall control	Conservative gain	Details
Northampton	No overall control	Liberal Democrats gain	Details
Oadby and Wigston	Liberal Democrats	Liberal Democrats hold	Details
Oswestry	No overall control	Conservative gain	Details
Restormel	No overall control	No overall control hold	Details
Ribble Valley	Conservative	Conservative hold	Details
Richmondshire	Independent	No overall control	Details
Rother	Conservative	Conservative hold	Details
Rushcliffe	Conservative	Conservative hold	Details
Ryedale	No overall control	No overall control hold	Details
Salisbury	Conservative	No overall control	Details
Scarborough	Conservative	No overall control	Details
Sedgefield	Labour	Labour hold	Details
Sedgemoor	Conservative	Conservative hold	Details
Selby	Conservative	Conservative hold	Details
Sevenoaks	Conservative	Conservative hold	Details
Shepway	No overall control	Conservative gain	Details
South Bucks	Conservative	Conservative hold	Details
South Derbyshire	Labour	Conservative gain	Details
South Hams	Conservative	Conservative hold	Details
South Holland	Conservative	Conservative hold	Details
South Kesteven	Conservative	Conservative hold	Details
South Norfolk	Liberal Democrats	Conservative gain	Details
South Northamptonshire	Conservative	Conservative hold	Details
South Oxfordshire	Conservative	Conservative hold	Details
South Ribble	No overall control	Conservative gain	Details
South Shropshire	No overall control	Conservative gain	Details
South Somerset	Liberal Democrats	Liberal Democrats hold	Details
South Staffordshire	Conservative	Conservative hold	Details
Spelthorne	Conservative	Conservative hold	Details
St Edmundsbury	Conservative	Conservative hold	Details
Stafford	Conservative	Conservative hold	Details
Staffordshire Moorlands	No overall control	Conservative gain	Details
Suffolk Coastal	Conservative	Conservative hold	Details
Surrey Heath	Conservative	Conservative hold	Details
Taunton Deane	Conservative	No overall control	Details
Teesdale	Independent	Independent hold	Details
Teignbridge	No overall control	No overall control hold	Details
Tendring	No overall control	No overall control hold	Details
Test Valley	Conservative	Conservative hold	Details
Tewkesbury	No overall control	No overall control hold	Details
Thanet	Conservative	Conservative hold	Details
Tonbridge and Malling	Conservative	Conservative hold	Details
Torridge	Independent	No overall control	Details
Tynedale	Conservative	Conservative hold	Details
Uttlesford	Liberal Democrats	Conservative gain	Details
Vale of White Horse	Liberal Democrats	Liberal Democrats hold	Details
Vale Royal	No overall control	No overall control hold	Details
Wansbeck	Labour	Labour hold	Details
Warwick	No overall control	Conservative gain	Details
Waverley	No overall control	Conservative gain	Details
Wealden	Conservative	Conservative hold	Details
Wear Valley	Labour	No overall control	Details
Wellingborough	Conservative	Conservative hold	Details
West Devon	No overall control	No overall control hold	Details
West Dorset	Conservative	Conservative hold	Details
West Somerset	Conservative	Independent gain	Details
West Wiltshire	No overall control	Conservative gain	Details
Wychavon	Conservative	Conservative hold	Details
Wycombe	Conservative	Conservative hold	Details
Wyre	Conservative	Conservative hold	Details

=== Third of council ===
In 78 English district authorities one third of the council was up for election.

Council	Previous control	Result	Details
Amber Valley	Conservative	Conservative hold	Details
Barrow-in-Furness	No overall control	No overall control hold	Details
Basildon	Conservative	Conservative hold	Details
Basingstoke and Deane	Conservative	Conservative hold	Details
Bassetlaw	Conservative	Conservative hold	Details
Bedford	No overall control	No overall control hold	Details
Brentwood	Conservative	Conservative hold	Details
Broxbourne	Conservative	Conservative hold	Details
Burnley	No overall control	No overall control hold	Details
Cambridge	Liberal Democrats	Liberal Democrats hold	Details
Cannock Chase	No overall control	No overall control hold	Details
Carlisle	No overall control	No overall control hold	Details
Castle Point	Conservative	Conservative hold	Details
Cherwell	Conservative	Conservative hold	Details
Chester	No overall control	Conservative gain	Details
Chorley	Conservative	Conservative hold	Details
Colchester	No overall control	No overall control hold	Details
Congleton	Conservative	Conservative hold	Details
Craven	No overall control	No overall control hold	Details
Crawley	Conservative	Conservative hold	Details
Crewe and Nantwich	No overall control	No overall control hold	Details
Daventry	Conservative	Conservative hold	Details
Eastleigh	Liberal Democrats	Liberal Democrats hold	Details
Ellesmere Port and Neston	Labour	Labour hold	Details
Elmbridge	No overall control	No overall control hold	Details
Epping Forest	Conservative	Conservative hold	Details
Exeter	No overall control	No overall control hold	Details
Gloucester	No overall control	No overall control hold	Details
Great Yarmouth	Conservative	Conservative hold	Details
Harlow	No overall control	No overall control hold	Details
Harrogate	No overall control	No overall control hold	Details
Hart	No overall control	No overall control hold	Details
Havant	Conservative	Conservative hold	Details
Hertsmere	Conservative	Conservative hold	Details
Huntingdonshire	Conservative	Conservative hold	Details
Hyndburn	Conservative	Conservative hold	Details
Ipswich	No overall control	No overall control hold	Details
Macclesfield	Conservative	Conservative hold	Details
Maidstone	No overall control	No overall control hold	Details
Mole Valley	Conservative	Conservative hold	Details
Newcastle-under-Lyme	No overall control	No overall control hold	Details
Norwich	No overall control	No overall control hold	Details
Pendle	Liberal Democrats	Liberal Democrats hold	Details
Penwith	No overall control	No overall control hold	Details
Preston	No overall control	No overall control hold	Details
Purbeck	Conservative	Conservative hold	Details
Redditch	No overall control	No overall control hold	Details
Reigate and Banstead	Conservative	Conservative hold	Details
Rochford	Conservative	Conservative hold	Details
Rossendale	Conservative	Conservative hold	Details
Rugby	No overall control	Conservative gain	Details
Runnymede	Conservative	Conservative hold	Details
Rushmoor	Conservative	Conservative hold	Details
Shrewsbury and Atcham	Conservative	Conservative hold	Details
South Bedfordshire	Conservative	Conservative hold	Details
South Cambridgeshire	No overall control	Conservative gain	Details
South Lakeland	Liberal Democrats	Liberal Democrats hold	Details
St Albans	Liberal Democrats	No overall control	Details
Stevenage	Labour	Labour hold	Details
Stratford-on-Avon	Conservative	Conservative hold	Details
Stroud	Conservative	Conservative hold	Details
Swale	Conservative	Conservative hold	Details
Tamworth	Conservative	Conservative hold	Details
Tandridge	Conservative	Conservative hold	Details
Three Rivers	Liberal Democrats	Liberal Democrats hold	Details
Tunbridge Wells	Conservative	Conservative hold	Details
Watford	Liberal Democrats	Liberal Democrats hold	Details
Waveney	Conservative	Conservative hold	Details
Welwyn Hatfield	Conservative	Conservative hold	Details
West Lancashire	Conservative	Conservative hold	Details
West Lindsey	Liberal Democrats	Liberal Democrats hold	Details
West Oxfordshire	Conservative	Conservative hold	Details
Weymouth and Portland	No overall control	No overall control hold	Details
Winchester	Conservative	Conservative hold	Details
Woking	No overall control	Conservative gain	Details
Worcester	Conservative	Conservative hold	Details
Worthing	Conservative	Conservative hold	Details
Wyre Forest	No overall control	No overall control hold	Details

=== Mayoral elections ===
Council	Independent	Conservative	Labour	Liberal Democrat	Green	Elected	Result
Bedford	15,967	10,710	4,757	10,551	1,538	Frank Branston	Independent hold
Mansfield	13,756	2,770	8,774	1,944	1,489	Tony Egginton	Independent hold
Middlesbrough	17,455	1,733	3,539	7,026	no candidate	Ray Mallon	Independent hold

== Scotland ==
All 32 Scottish councils had all their seats up for election - all Scottish councils are unitary authorities. These local elections were held on the same day as the Scottish Parliament general election. They were the first election for local government in mainland Great Britain to use the Single transferable vote (the system is used in Northern Ireland), as implemented by the Local Governance (Scotland) Act 2004.

=== Summary of results ===
Party	Councils - majority	Councils - in coalition/minority	Councillors
SNP	0	11	363
Labour	2	11	348
Liberal Democrats	0	12	166
Conservative	0	8	143
Green	0	0	8
Scottish Socialist Party	0	0	1
Solidarity	0	0	1
Other	3	9	193
No overall control	27	-	-

=== Councils ===
The notional results in the following table are based on a document that John Curtice and Stephen Herbert (Professors at the University of Strathclyde) produced on 3 June 2005, calculating the effect of the introduction of the Single Transferable Vote on the 2003 Scottish Local Elections.

Council	2003 result (control before May 2007, if different)	Notional control (based on 2003 results)	2007 result	Details
Aberdeen City	No overall control (LD + Con)	NOC	No overall control (LD + SNP)	Details
Aberdeenshire	No overall control (LD + Ind)	NOC	No overall control (LD + Con)	Details
Angus	SNP	NOC	No overall control (Ind + Con + LD + Lab)	Details
Argyll and Bute	Independent	Independent	No overall control (Ind + SNP)	Details
Clackmannanshire	Labour	NOC	No overall control (Lab minority)	Details
Dumfries and Galloway	No overall control (Lab)	NOC	No overall control (Con + LD)	Details
Dundee City	No overall control (Lab + LD+ Con)	NOC	No overall control (Lab + LD)	Details
East Ayrshire	Labour	Labour	No overall control (SNP minority)	Details
East Dunbartonshire	No overall control (LD)	NOC	No overall control (Lab + Con)	Details
East Lothian	Labour	NOC	No overall control (SNP + LD)	Details
East Renfrewshire	No overall control (Lab + LD)	NOC	No overall control (Lab + LD + Ind + Con)	Details
City of Edinburgh	Labour (NOC: Lab)	NOC	No overall control (LD + SNP)	Details
Falkirk	No overall control (SNP + Ind + Con)	NOC	No overall control (Lab + Ind + Con)	Details
Fife	No overall control (Lab)	NOC	No overall control (LD + SNP)	Details
Glasgow City	Labour	Labour	Labour	Details
Highland	Independent	Independent	No overall control (Ind + SNP)	Details
Inverclyde	Liberal Democrats	NOC	No overall control (Lab minority)	Details
Midlothian	Labour	NOC	No overall control (Lab minority)	Details
Moray	Independent	Independent	No overall control (Ind + Con)	Details
Na h-Eileanan Siar	Independent	Independent	Independent	Details
North Ayrshire	Labour	Labour	No overall control (Lab minority)	Details
North Lanarkshire	Labour	Labour	Labour	Details
Orkney	Independent	Independent	Independent	Details
Perth and Kinross	No overall control (SNP + LD + Ind)	NOC	No overall control (SNP + LD)	Details
Renfrewshire	Labour	NOC	No overall control (SNP + LD)	Details
Scottish Borders	No overall control (Ind + Con)	NOC	No overall control (Ind + Con + LD)	Details
Shetland	Independent	Independent	Independent	Details
South Ayrshire	No overall control (Con)	NOC	No overall control (Con minority)	Details
South Lanarkshire	Labour	Labour	No overall control (Lab minority)	Details
Stirling	Labour (NOC: Lab)	NOC	No overall control (Lab minority)	Details
West Dunbartonshire	Labour	Labour	No overall control (SNP + Ind)	Details
West Lothian	Labour	NOC	No overall control (SNP + Ind)	Details

== Pre-election predictions ==
A Newsnight poll by the analysts Rallings and Thrasher some days before the election predicted the following results for the English council elections:

Con 38% (Conservatives gaining 330 seats and losing 2% of the vote on 2006)

Lab 24% (Labour losing 500 seats and losing 2% of the vote on 2006)

LD 29% (Liberal Democrats gaining 110 seats and gaining 2% of the vote on 2006)

However, these predictions, as in 2006, were largely inaccurate, underestimating Conservative support and grossly overestimating the Lib Dems' performance. However, it did accurately predict the number of seats Labour would lose.
