= 2007 Cambridge City Council election =

Cambridge City Council election

Map of the results

The 2007 Cambridge City Council election took place on 3 May 2007 to elect members of Cambridge City Council in England. This was on the same day as other nationwide local elections.

== Results summary ==
2007 Cambridge City Council election
Party	This election			Full council			This election		
Party	Seats	Net	Seats %	Other	Total	Total %	Votes	Votes %	+/−
Liberal Democrats	10	Steady	66.7	19	29	69.0	10,480	33.1	-5.5
Labour	5	Steady	33.3	8	13	31.0	8,587	27.1	+1.7
Conservative	0	Steady	0.0	0	0	0.0	7,880	24.9	+3.5
Green	0	Steady	0.0	0	0	0.0	4,010	12.7	+0.1
Respect	0	Steady	0.0	0	0	0.0	358	1.1	-0.6
UKIP	0	Steady	0.0	0	0	0.0	352	1.1	+0.7

== Ward results ==
=== Abbey ===
Abbey
Party	Candidate	Votes	%	±%
Labour	Caroline Hart	701	35.5	−1.9
Green	Margaret Wright	593	30.0	+4.0
Conservative	Andrew Bower	398	20.1	−0.2
Liberal Democrats	Ed Sexton	284	14.4	−1.9
Majority		108	5.5	−5.9
Turnout		1,976	30.8	+2.3
Labour hold		Swing	▼3.0	

=== Arbury ===
Arbury
Party	Candidate	Votes	%	±%
Liberal Democrats	Alan Levy	887	35.8	−4.5
Labour	Mike Todd-Jones	875	35.3	+3.2
Conservative	Shapour Meftah	504	20.3	+1.3
Green	Michael Smith	211	8.5	−0.1
Majority		12	0.5	−7.6
Turnout		2,477	37.4	+0.5
Liberal Democrats hold		Swing	▼3.9	

=== Castle ===
Castle
Party	Candidate	Votes	%	±%
Liberal Democrats	Tania Zmura	806	42.5	−5.8
Conservative	Edward MacNaughten	490	25.8	+2.5
Green	Margery Abbott	309	16.3	+1.7
Labour	Margery Abbott	293	15.4	+1.6
Majority		316	16.6	−8.3
Turnout		1,898	29.8	−1.7
Liberal Democrats hold		Swing	▼4.2	

=== Cherry Hinton ===
Cherry Hinton
Party	Candidate	Votes	%	±%
Labour	Russ McPherson	1,126	46.1	+3.2
Conservative	Sarah El-Neil	806	33.0	−1.6
Liberal Democrats	Keith Edkins	257	10.5	−4.2
Green	Hamish Downer	130	5.3	−2.4
UKIP	Marjorie Barr	121	5.0	N/A
Majority		320	13.1	+4.8
Turnout		2,440	39.4	−0.3
Labour hold		Swing	▲2.4	

=== Coleridge ===
Coleridge (2 seats due to by-election)
Party	Candidate	Votes	%
Labour	Jeremy Benstead	861	39.8
Labour	Tariq Sadiq	739	34.1
Conservative	Christopher Howell	721	33.3
Conservative	Richard Normington	662	30.6
Liberal Democrats	Emma Lindsay	312	14.4
Green	Valerie Hopkins	253	11.7
Liberal Democrats	Thomas Yates	248	11.5
Green	Neil Ford	215	9.9
UKIP	Albert Watts	116	5.4
Turnout		2,165	36.3
Labour hold			
Labour hold			

=== East Chesterton ===
East Chesterton
Party	Candidate	Votes	%	±%
Liberal Democrats	Clare Blair	731	34.6	−6.0
Conservative	Kevin Francis	583	27.6	+5.5
Labour	Stefan Haselwimmer	457	21.6	−5.2
Green	Peter Pope	225	10.7	+0.2
UKIP	Peter Burkinshaw	115	5.4	N/A
Majority		148	7.0	−6.8
Turnout		2,111	36.3	+0.4
Liberal Democrats hold		Swing	▼5.8	

=== King's Hedges ===
King's Hedges
Party	Candidate	Votes	%	±%
Liberal Democrats	Michael Pill	679	35.9	−4.1
Labour	Gerri Bird	661	35.0	+5.3
Conservative	Michelle Tempest	368	19.5	±0.0
Green	James Youd	181	9.6	−1.2
Majority		18	0.9	−9.4
Turnout		1,889	32.8	+3.2
Liberal Democrats gain from Labour		Swing	▼4.7	

=== Market ===
Market
Party	Candidate	Votes	%	±%
Liberal Democrats	Mike Dixon	679	42.4	−0.3
Green	Gergory Patton	344	21.5	+1.6
Conservative	Timothy Haire	341	21.3	−0.4
Labour	Lucy Sheerman	237	14.8	−1.0
Majority		335	20.9	−0.1
Turnout		1,601	25.7	−3.0
Liberal Democrats hold		Swing	▼1.0	

=== Newnham ===
Newnham
Party	Candidate	Votes	%	±%
Liberal Democrats	Julie Smith	842	44.9	−1.3
Conservative	James Strachan	489	26.1	+3.5
Green	Aneaka Kaur Kellay	300	16.0	+0.8
Labour	Louis Couffait	246	13.1	−2.9
Majority		353	18.8	−4.9
Turnout		1,877	28.8	−2.9
Liberal Democrats hold		Swing	▼2.4	

=== Petersfield ===
Petersfield
Party	Candidate	Votes	%	±%
Labour	Lucy Walker	1,063	45.3	+6.3
Liberal Democrats	Steven Cooper	817	34.9	−2.8
Conservative	James Martin	239	10.2	−0.6
Green	Shayne Mitchell	225	9.6	−2.9
Majority		246	10.4	+9.0
Turnout		2,344	38.7	+2.9
Labour gain from Liberal Democrats		Swing	▲4.6	

=== Queen's Edith ===
Queen's Edith
Party	Candidate	Votes	%	±%
Liberal Democrats	Viki Sanders	1,364	53.4	−3.3
Conservative	Donald Douglas	760	29.7	+1.7
Labour	Len Freeman	221	8.6	+0.3
Green	Martin Lawson	210	8.2	+1.3
Majority		604	23.6	−5.1
Turnout		2,555	42.2	+1.4
Liberal Democrats hold		Swing	▼2.5	

=== Romsey ===
Romsey
Party	Candidate	Votes	%	±%
Liberal Democrats	Rah Shah	774	36.2	−5.2
Labour	Jonathan Goodacre	496	23.2	−1.0
Respect	Tom Woodcock	358	16.8	+5.4
Green	Jesse Griffiths	271	12.7	−1.2
Conservative	Angela Ozturk	238	11.1	+2.0
Majority		278	13.0	—
Turnout		2,137	34.9	−2.1
Liberal Democrats hold		Swing	▼2.1	

=== Trumpington ===
Trumpington
Party	Candidate	Votes	%	±%
Liberal Democrats	Andy Blackhurst	913	45.2	−0.3
Conservative	Peter Hase	774	38.3	+2.6
Green	Ceri Galloway	172	8.5	−1.2
Labour	Pamela Stacey	160	7.9	−1.2
Majority		139	6.9	−3.0
Turnout		2,019	37.9	−1.6
Liberal Democrats hold		Swing	▼1.5	

=== West Chesterton ===
West Chesterton
Party	Candidate	Votes	%	±%
Liberal Democrats	Diane Armstrong	887	40.0	−2.5
Conservative	Steven Mastin	507	22.9	+2.1
Labour	Simon Watkins	451	20.4	+1.6
Green	Sarah Peake	371	16.7	−1.2
Majority		380	17.1	−4.7
Turnout		2,216	36.0	−0.7
Liberal Democrats hold		Swing	▼2.3	
