= 2007 Waveney District Council election =

2007 UK local government election

Map of the results

The 2007 Waveney District Council election took place on 3 May 2007 to elect members of Waveney District Council in England. This was on the same day as other local elections.

== Summary ==
2007 Waveney District Council election
Party	This election			Full council			This election		
Party	Seats	Net	Seats %	Other	Total	Total %	Votes	Votes %	+/−
Conservative	8	Steady	50.0	21	29	60.4	8,414	36.0	-4.7
Labour	5	Steady	31.3	7	12	25.0	6,917	29.6	+3.9
Liberal Democrats	1	Steady	6.3	2	3	6.3	2,751	11.8	-1.1
Independent	1	▼1	6.3	2	3	6.3	1,187	5.1	-3.5
Green	1	▲1	6.3	0	1	2.1	2,570	11.0	+1.9
UKIP	0	Steady	0.0	0	0	0.0	1,524	6.5	+3.4
