= 2007 North Norfolk District Council election =

North Norfolk District Council election

- 3 May 2007

All 48 seats to North Norfolk District Council 25 seats needed for a majority

	First party	Second party	Third party
Party	Liberal Democrats	Conservative	Independent
Seats won	30	16	2
Seat change	▲2	▲2	▼4
Popular vote	26,874	22,390	3,219
Percentage	48.2%	40.1%	5.8%
Swing	▲6.2%	▲2.6%	▼7.4%
Control before election
Liberal Democrats
Control after election
Liberal Democrats

The 2007 North Norfolk District Council election took place on 3 May 2007 to elect members of North Norfolk District Council in England. This was on the same day as other local elections.

== Summary ==
=== Election result ===
2007 North Norfolk District Council election
Party	Candidates	Seats	Gains	Losses	Net gain/loss	Seats %	Votes %	Votes	+/−
Liberal Democrats	48	30	3	1	▲2	62.5	48.2	26,874	+6.2
Conservative	45	16	3	1	▲2	33.3	40.1	22,390	+2.6
Independent	10	2	0	4	▼4	4.2	5.8	3,219	–7.4
Labour	14	0	0	0	Steady	0.0	3.8	2,122	–2.0
UKIP	5	0	0	0	Steady	0.0	1.0	571	N/A
Green	5	0	0	0	Steady	0.0	0.9	528	–0.6
English Democrat	1	0	0	0	Steady	0.0	0.1	77	N/A

== Ward results ==
Incumbent councillors standing for re-election are marked with an asterisk (*). Changes in seats do not take into account by-elections or defections.

=== Astley ===
Astley
Party	Candidate	Votes	%	±%
Liberal Democrats	Robin Combe	475	53.9	
Conservative	John Fiddian	331	37.6	
Green	Sharon Harvey	75	8.5	
Majority		144	16.3	
Turnout		881	48.3	
Registered electors		1,830		
Liberal Democrats gain from Independent		Swing		

=== Briston ===
Briston
Party	Candidate	Votes	%	±%
Liberal Democrats	John Wyatt*	494	56.5	
Conservative	Russell Wright	380	43.5	
Majority		114	13.0	
Turnout		874	47.3	
Registered electors		1,859		
Liberal Democrats hold		Swing		

=== Chaucer ===
Chaucer
Party	Candidate	Votes	%	±%
Liberal Democrats	Anthea Sweeney	561	55.4	
Conservative	John Fitch	452	44.6	
Majority		109	10.8	
Turnout		1,013	53.2	
Registered electors		1,921		
Liberal Democrats hold		Swing		

=== Corpusty ===
Corpusty
Party	Candidate	Votes	%	±%
Conservative	John Perry-Warnes*	636	56.0	
Liberal Democrats	Julia Dovey	424	37.4	
UKIP	Terry Comber	75	6.6	
Majority		212	18.7	
Turnout		1,135	59.4	
Registered electors		1,917		
Conservative hold		Swing		

=== Cromer Town ===
Cromer Town (2 seats)
Party	Candidate	Votes	%	±%
Conservative	Benjie Cabbell-Manners	594	43.1	
Conservative	Keith Johnson	531	38.5	
Liberal Democrats	Anthony Nash	406	29.5	
Liberal Democrats	Cat Plewman	317	23.0	
Labour	Phil Harris	218	15.8	
Labour	Colin Vanlint	193	14.0	
Independent	John Morgan	160	11.6	
Independent	Larry Randall*	157	11.4	
Turnout		~1,376	43.1	
Registered electors		3,184		
Conservative hold				
Conservative hold				

=== Erpingham ===
Erpingham
Party	Candidate	Votes	%	±%
Conservative	Peter Willcox*	584	63.1	
Liberal Democrats	Brian Morris	341	36.9	
Majority		243	26.3	
Turnout		925	48.0	
Registered electors		1,939		
Conservative hold		Swing		

=== Gaunt ===
Gaunt
Party	Candidate	Votes	%	±%
Liberal Democrats	Graham Jones*	592	56.6	
Conservative	Jim Page	392	37.5	
Labour	Graham Pinner	62	5.9	
Majority		200	19.1	
Turnout		1,046	54.6	
Registered electors		1,933		
Liberal Democrats hold		Swing		

=== Glaven Valley ===
Glaven Valley
Party	Candidate	Votes	%	±%
Conservative	Lindsay Brettle	569	56.9	
Liberal Democrats	David Young	431	43.1	
Majority		138	13.8	
Turnout		1,000	50.6	
Registered electors		1,981		
Conservative hold		Swing		

=== Happisburgh ===
Happisburgh
Party	Candidate	Votes	%	±%
Liberal Democrats	Lee Garrigan	586	62.6	
Conservative	Oscar Nieboer	350	37.4	
Majority		236	25.2	
Turnout		936	45.4	
Registered electors		2,067		
Liberal Democrats hold		Swing		

=== High Heath ===
High Heath
Party	Candidate	Votes	%	±%
Liberal Democrats	Henry Cordeaux*	534	54.1	
Conservative	Nicholas Deterding	397	40.2	
UKIP	Lynette Comber	56	5.7	
Majority		137	13.9	
Turnout		987	57.2	
Registered electors		1,732		
Liberal Democrats hold		Swing		

=== Holt ===
Holt (2 seats)
Party	Candidate	Votes	%	±%
Liberal Democrats	Philip High	906	36.3	
Independent	Michael Baker*	835	33.5	
Conservative	John Blyth	623	25.0	
Liberal Democrats	Bridget Cuthbert	513	20.6	
Green	Paula d'Attoma	129	5.2	
Turnout		~2,494	57.9	
Registered electors		2,970		
Liberal Democrats hold				
Independent hold				

=== Hoveton ===
Hoveton
Party	Candidate	Votes	%	±%
Conservative	Nigel Dixon	501	52.0	
Independent	Carolyn Williams	342	35.5	
Liberal Democrats	Susan Morse	121	12.6	
Majority		159	16.5	
Turnout		964	55.4	
Registered electors		1,739		
Conservative hold		Swing		

=== Lancaster North ===
Lancaster North (2 seats)
Party	Candidate	Votes	%	±%
Liberal Democrats	Maggie Fleming	616	57.4	
Liberal Democrats	Sean Mears	605	56.4	
Conservative	Roy Reynolds	458	42.7	
Conservative	Theo Fanthorpe	456	42.5	
Turnout		~1,073	39.7	
Registered electors		2,881		
Liberal Democrats hold				
Liberal Democrats hold				

=== Lancaster South ===
Lancaster South (2 seats)
Party	Candidate	Votes	%	±%
Liberal Democrats	Stephanie Towers*	669	54.8	
Liberal Democrats	Gloria Lisher	616	50.5	
Conservative	Roy Banham	552	45.2	
Conservative	John Rest	457	37.5	
Turnout		~1,221	37.5	
Registered electors		3,276		
Liberal Democrats hold				
Liberal Democrats hold				

=== Mundesley ===
Mundesley (2 seats)
Party	Candidate	Votes	%	±%
Conservative	Wyndham Northam*	832	57.5	
Conservative	Barry Smith	776	53.6	
Liberal Democrats	David Correa-Hunt	616	42.5	
Liberal Democrats	Paddy Wilkins	608	42.0	
Turnout		~1,527	43.9	
Registered electors		3,481		
Conservative hold				
Conservative gain from Independent				

=== North Walsham East ===
North Walsham East (2 seats)
Party	Candidate	Votes	%	±%
Liberal Democrats	Patricia Ford*	960	65.4	
Liberal Democrats	Peter Moore*	935	63.7	
Conservative	Rhona Sherry	374	25.5	
Conservative	Sarah Thompson	335	22.8	
Green	Joanne Todd	133	9.1	
Turnout		~1,468	40.6	
Registered electors		3,371		
Liberal Democrats hold				
Liberal Democrats hold				

=== North Walsham North ===
North Walsham North (2 seats)
Party	Candidate	Votes	%	±%
Liberal Democrats	Eric Seward	724	55.5	
Liberal Democrats	Ann Moore	707	54.2	
Conservative	Mike Judd	352	27.0	
Conservative	David Keable	266	20.4	
Independent	Jo Turner*	229	17.5	
Turnout		~1,305	36.5	
Registered electors		3,276		
Liberal Democrats hold				
Liberal Democrats hold				

=== North Walsham West ===
North Walsham West (2 seats)
Party	Candidate	Votes	%	±%
Liberal Democrats	Mark Birch*	930	69.1	
Liberal Democrats	Virginia Gay*	873	64.9	
Conservative	Anne Rose	415	30.9	
Conservative	Helen Bartram	384	28.6	
Turnout		~1,345	43.3	
Registered electors		3,098		
Liberal Democrats hold				
Liberal Democrats hold				

=== Poppyland ===
Poppyland
Party	Candidate	Votes	%	±%
Conservative	Angie Tillett*	659	69.8	
Liberal Democrats	John Barker	285	30.2	
Majority		374	39.6	
Turnout		944	49.5	
Registered electors		1,916		
Conservative hold		Swing		

=== Priory ===
Priory (2 seats)
Party	Candidate	Votes	%	±%
Conservative	Jonathan Savory*	972	48.8	
Liberal Democrats	Joyce Trett*	774	38.9	
Conservative	Charles Tucker	616	30.9	
Liberal Democrats	Roberta Hamond	523	26.3	
Labour	Mike Gates	245	12.3	
Labour	Andy Gates	183	9.2	
Turnout		~1,992	53.5	
Registered electors		3,483		
Conservative hold				
Liberal Democrats hold				

=== Roughton ===
Roughton
Party	Candidate	Votes	%	±%
Conservative	Sue Arnold*	429	48.5	
Liberal Democrats	Mary Seward	204	23.1	
Labour	David Spencer	174	19.7	
English Democrat	Christine Constable	77	8.7	
Majority		225	25.5	
Turnout		884	49.8	
Registered electors		1,781		
Conservative hold		Swing		

=== Scottow ===
Scottow
Party	Candidate	Votes	%	±%
Liberal Democrats	Spencer Whalley	330	55.6	
Conservative	Alistair Mackay	263	44.4	
Majority		67	11.3	
Turnout		593	40.4	
Registered electors		1,471		
Liberal Democrats gain from Independent		Swing		

=== Sheringham North ===
Sheringham North (2 seats)
Party	Candidate	Votes	%	±%
Liberal Democrats	Brian Hannah*	717	48.5	
Liberal Democrats	Penny Bevan Jones	524	35.5	
Conservative	Janet Farrow	518	35.1	
Conservative	Madeleine Ashcroft	379	25.7	
Labour	David Thompson	91	6.2	
UKIP	David Wilson	89	6.0	
Labour	Harry Bennett	81	5.5	
Green	Martin Langsdon	62	4.2	
Turnout		~1,478	43.5	
Registered electors		3,023		
Liberal Democrats hold				
Liberal Democrats hold				

=== Sheringham South ===
Sheringham South (2 seats)
Party	Candidate	Votes	%	±%
Liberal Democrats	Hilary Nelson*	797	51.9	
Liberal Democrats	Julia Moss	699	45.5	
Conservative	Mac McGinn	609	39.7	
Conservative	Andrea Johnson	576	37.5	
Green	Peter Morrison	129	8.4	
Turnout		~1,536	46.2	
Registered electors		3,183		
Liberal Democrats hold				
Liberal Democrats hold				

=== St. Benet ===
St. Benet
Party	Candidate	Votes	%	±%
Liberal Democrats	Barbara McGoun	561	58.7	
Conservative	Derek Hogg	331	34.6	
Labour	Clive Sellick	64	6.7	
Majority		230	24.1	
Turnout		956	52.4	
Registered electors		1,832		
Liberal Democrats hold		Swing		

=== Stalham & Sutton ===
Stalham & Sutton (2 seats)
Party	Candidate	Votes	%	±%
Liberal Democrats	Candy Sheridan*	563	30.6	
Conservative	George Barran*	497	27.0	
Independent	Roy Woolsey	490	26.7	
Liberal Democrats	Pauline Grove-Jones	488	26.6	
Conservative	Stephen Eldred	347	18.9	
Labour	Sheila Cunningham	288	15.7	
Labour	Nick Webb	135	7.3	
Turnout		~1,840	43.2	
Registered electors		3,456		
Liberal Democrats hold				
Conservative hold				

=== Suffield Park ===
Suffield Park (2 seats)
Party	Candidate	Votes	%	±%
Conservative	Nigel Ripley*	725	46.7	
Conservative	John Lee	704	45.3	
Liberal Democrats	Gordon Cavanagh	419	27.0	
Liberal Democrats	Neale Grearson	409	26.3	
Independent	Vera Woodcock	216	13.9	
Independent	Reginald Robinson	119	7.7	
UKIP	Gwendoline Smith	101	6.5	
Labour	Michael Cox	91	5.9	
Turnout		~1,552	44.6	
Registered electors		3,300		
Conservative hold				
Conservative hold				

=== The Raynhams ===
The Raynhams
Party	Candidate	Votes	%	±%
Liberal Democrats	Dawn Wakefield	401	61.6	
UKIP	Stuart Agnew	250	38.4	
Majority		151	23.2	
Turnout		651	35.0	
Registered electors		1,876		
Liberal Democrats hold		Swing		

=== The Runtons ===
The Runtons
Party	Candidate	Votes	%	±%
Conservative	Victor Saunders	524	50.1	
Liberal Democrats	Lucinda Starling	521	49.9	
Majority		3	0.3	
Turnout		1,045	59.7	
Registered electors		1,762		
Conservative gain from Liberal Democrats		Swing		

=== Walsingham ===
Walsingham
Party	Candidate	Votes	%	±%
Independent	Tom Moore*	612	74.4	
Liberal Democrats	Gerry Plowright	211	25.6	
Majority		401	48.7	
Turnout		823	44.1	
Registered electors		1,879		
Independent hold		Swing		

=== Waterside ===
Waterside (2 seats)
Party	Candidate	Votes	%	±%
Liberal Democrats	Simon Partridge*	861	53.4	
Liberal Democrats	Clive Stockton	679	42.1	
Conservative	Colin Robertshaw	601	37.3	
Conservative	Jean Eldred	458	28.4	
Labour	Mick French	149	9.2	
Turnout		~1,613	44.2	
Registered electors		3,611		
Liberal Democrats hold				
Liberal Democrats hold				

=== Waxham ===
Waxham
Party	Candidate	Votes	%	±%
Conservative	Richard Price	408	46.8	
Liberal Democrats	Jean Partridge	316	36.2	
Labour	David Russell	148	17.0	
Majority		92	10.6	
Turnout		872	47.0	
Registered electors		1,863		
Conservative gain from Independent		Swing		

=== Wensum ===
Wensum
Party	Candidate	Votes	%	±%
Liberal Democrats	Ann Green*	477	50.5	
Conservative	Maureen Cushing	408	43.2	
Independent	Sally Longden	59	6.3	
Majority		69	7.3	
Turnout		944	49.7	
Registered electors		1,903		
Liberal Democrats hold		Swing		

=== Worstead ===
Worstead
Party	Candidate	Votes	%	±%
Liberal Democrats	Cath Wilkins*	555	60.1	
Conservative	Hugh Stimpson	369	39.9	
Majority		186	20.1	
Turnout		924	49.2	
Registered electors		1,883		
Liberal Democrats hold		Swing		

== By-Elections ==
North Walsham West By-Election 4 June 2009
Party	Candidate	Votes	%	±%
Liberal Democrats	Mary Seward	808	62.7	−6.7
Conservative	Christopher Hall	385	29.9	−1.0
Labour	Phil Harris	95	7.4	N/A
Majority		423	32.8	
Turnout		1,288		
Liberal Democrats hold		Swing		

Walsingham By-Election 1 October 2009
Party	Candidate	Votes	%	±%
Liberal Democrats	Hugh Lanham	389	58.1	+32.5
Conservative	Tom Fitzpatrick	237	35.4	N/A
Labour	Michael Gates	43	6.4	N/A
Majority		152	22.7	
Turnout		669	36.6	
Liberal Democrats gain from Independent		Swing		

The Runtons By-Election 15 October 2009
Party	Candidate	Votes	%	±%
Conservative	Helen Eales	524	52.1	+2.0
Liberal Democrats	Lucinda Starling	454	45.1	−4.8
Green	Alicia Hull	14	1.4	N/A
Labour	David Russell	14	1.4	N/A
Majority		70	7.0	
Turnout		1,006	55.9	
Conservative hold		Swing		

Lancaster South By-Election 6 May 2010
Party	Candidate	Votes	%	±%
Liberal Democrats	John Lisher	1,066	54.1	−0.4
Conservative	Tom Fitzpatrick	784	39.8	−5.2
Green	Monika Wiedmann	122	6.2	N/A
Majority		282	14.3	
Turnout		1,972	61.1	
Liberal Democrats hold		Swing		
