= 2007 Wear Valley District Council election =

2007 UK local government election

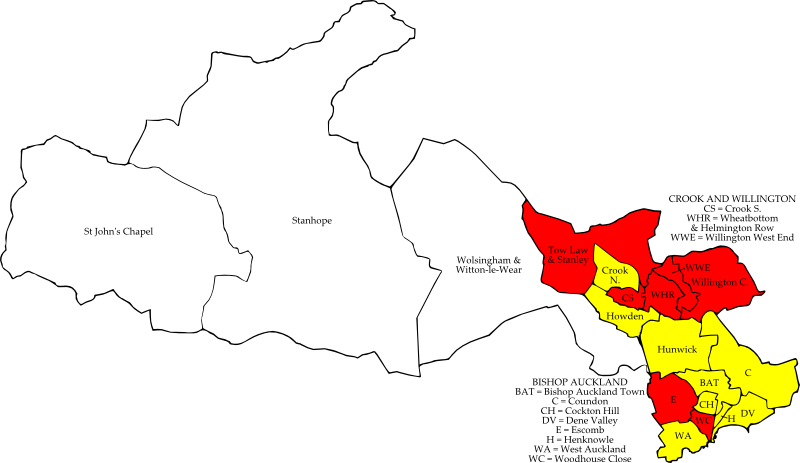
Map of the Wear Valley 2007 District Council election results

The 2007 Wear Valley District Council election took place on 3 May 2007 to elect members of Wear Valley District Council in England. This took place on the same day as other local elections across the UK.

All of the seats being contested were last contested in 2003.

Bishop Auckland Town (2 seats)
Party	Candidate	Votes	%	±%
Liberal Democrats	Samuel Zair	374	52.2	
Liberal Democrats	Sharon Ord	248		
Labour	Bill Wade	181	25.2	
Labour	Frederick Anderson	176		
Conservative	Colin Firby	162	22.6	
Conservative	Hazel Lodge	160		
Turnout			29.1	
Liberal Democrats gain from Labour		Swing		
Liberal Democrats gain from Independent		Swing		

Cockton Hill (3 seats)
Party	Candidate	Votes	%	±%
Liberal Democrats	Neil Harrison	600	36.7	
Liberal Democrats	Alan Anderson	597		
Labour	Barbara Laurie	559	34.1	
Conservative	Colin Raine	478	29.2	
Conservative	Jim Tague	458		
Liberal Democrats	Graham Snaith	451		
Conservative	John Gasston	437		
Labour	Keith Stokeld	431		
Turnout			39.7	
Liberal Democrats hold		Swing		
Liberal Democrats hold		Swing		
Labour hold		Swing		

Coundon (3 seats)
Party	Candidate	Votes	%	±%
Liberal Democrats	Tommy Taylor	516	51	
Liberal Democrats	Diane Hardaker	506		
Labour	Neil Stonehouse	495	49	
Labour	Lucy Thompson	465		
Labour	Norman Strongman	370		
Turnout			31.1	
Liberal Democrats hold		Swing		
Liberal Democrats gain from Labour		Swing		
Labour hold		Swing		

Crook North
Party	Candidate	Votes	%	±%
Liberal Democrats	Patricia Jopling	222	54.7	
Labour	Graeme McKellar	184	45.3	
Turnout			30	
Liberal Democrats gain from Labour		Swing		

Crook South (3 seats)
Party	Candidate	Votes	%	±%
Labour	Eddie Murphy	625	43.9	
Labour	Geoff Mowbray	622		
Liberal Democrats	Ann Carrick	580	40.7	
Labour	Peter Sung	541		
Liberal Democrats	David English	504		
Liberal Democrats	Gavin Jopling	449		
BNP	Robert Muir	219	15.3	
Turnout			33.2	
Labour hold		Swing		
Labour hold		Swing		
Liberal Democrats gain from Labour		Swing		

Dene Valley (2 seats)
Party	Candidate	Votes	%	±%
Liberal Democrats	Dorothy Burn	361	59.3	
Liberal Democrats	Gary Henry	346		
Labour	Margaret Ingledew	248	40.7	
Labour	Sandra Lethbridge	222		
Turnout			28.6	
Liberal Democrats hold		Swing		
Liberal Democrats hold		Swing		

Escomb (2 seats)
Party	Candidate	Votes	%	±%
Labour	Robert Yorke		35.1	
Liberal Democrats	Vince Perkins	290	34.1	
Liberal Democrats	John Fenwick	280		
Conservative	Peter Laws	262	30.8	
Labour	Olwyn Gunn	260		
Conservative	Alisha Lynas	250		
Turnout			36.1	
Labour gain from Liberal Democrats		Swing		
Liberal Democrats hold		Swing		

Henknowle (2 seats)
Party	Candidate	Votes	%	±%
Liberal Democrats	Betty Todd	443	53.8	
Labour	John Lethbridge	381	46.2	
Liberal Democrats	John Huntington	371		
Labour	Reg Davison	368		
Turnout			29.9	
Liberal Democrats hold		Swing		
Labour hold		Swing		

Howden
Party	Candidate	Votes	%	±%
Liberal Democrats	John Bailey	336	74.7	
Labour	Steven Cason	114	25.3	
Turnout			32.8	
Liberal Democrats gain from Labour		Swing		

Hunwick
Party	Candidate	Votes	%	±%
Liberal Democrats	Kenneth Bowser	270	53.9	
Labour	David Nevins	231	46.1	
Turnout			35.1	
Liberal Democrats gain from Labour		Swing		

St John's Chapel
Party	Candidate	Votes	%	±%
Independent	John Shuttleworth	640	88.6	
Conservative	Christopher Houghton	82	11.4	
Turnout			59.6	
Independent hold		Swing		

Stanhope (2 seats)
Party	Candidate	Votes	%	±%
Independent	Thomas Mews	579	36.1	
Independent	Angela Bolam	510		
Labour	William Hobson	421	26.3	
Conservative	Christopher Rowell	359	22.4	
Liberal Democrats	Anthony Simpson	244	15.2	
Turnout			43.1	
Independent hold		Swing		
Independent gain from Labour		Swing		

Tow Law & Stanley (3 seats)
Party	Candidate	Votes	%	±%
Labour	Colin Hayton	418	34.2	
Labour	Jeff Gale	407		
Independent	Ron Grogan	399	32.6	
Labour	Jack Walker	334		
Liberal Democrats	David Halliday	246	20.1	
Conservative	Harvey Morgan	161	13.2	
Turnout			29.4	
Labour hold		Swing		
Labour hold		Swing		
Independent hold		Swing		

West Auckland (3 seats)
Party	Candidate	Votes	%	±%
Liberal Democrats	Colin Mairs	556	50.2	
Labour	Margaret Douthwaite	552	49.8	
Liberal Democrats	John Ferguson	539		
Liberal Democrats	Pauline Fenwick	455		
Labour	Christine Wilson	432		
Labour	Andrew Turner	372		
Turnout			31.2	
Liberal Democrats gain from Labour		Swing		
Labour hold		Swing		
Liberal Democrats hold		Swing		

Wheatbottom and Helmington Row (2 seats)
Party	Candidate	Votes	%	±%
Labour	Roger Ward	384	55.6	
Labour	Rose Seabury	337		
Liberal Democrats	Eileen Gooch	307	44.4	
Liberal Democrats	James Gooch	296		
Turnout			31.2	
Labour hold		Swing		
Labour hold		Swing		

Willington Central (3 seats)
Party	Candidate	Votes	%	±%
Labour	David Kingston	676	55.5	
Labour	Alan Sinclair	663		
Labour	Joe Buckham	642		
Liberal Democrats	John Ferguson	543	44.5	
Turnout			29.3	
Labour hold		Swing		
Labour hold		Swing		
Labour hold		Swing		

Willington West End
Party	Candidate	Votes	%	±%
Labour	Margaret Pinkney	256	48.8	
Conservative	Becky Brunskill	172	32.8	
Liberal Democrats	Anne Glynn	97	18.5	
Turnout			42.3	
Liberal Democrats gain from Labour		Swing		

Wolsingham and Witton-le-Wear (2 seats)
Party	Candidate	Votes	%	±%
Independent	Vere Shuttleworth	618	68.1	
Independent	Desmond Wilson	500		
Conservative	Christopher Rowell	289	31.9	
Conservative	Christopher Rowell	274		
Turnout			36.4	
Independent hold		Swing		
Independent hold		Swing		

Woodhouse Close (3 seats)
Party	Candidate	Votes	%	±%
Labour	David Wilson	404	58	
Labour	June Lee	375		
Labour	Charlie Kay	368		
Liberal Democrats	Lesley Zair	292	42	
Liberal Democrats	Pauline Ferguson	278		
Turnout			21.9	
Labour hold		Swing		
Labour hold		Swing		
Labour hold		Swing		
