= 2007 Forest Heath District Council election =

Forest Heath District Council election

Map of the results

The 2007 Forest Heath District Council election took place on 3 May 2007 to elect members of Forest Heath District Council in England. This was on the same day as other local elections across the country.

== Summary ==
2007 Forest Heath District Council election
Party	Seats	Gains	Losses	Net gain/loss	Seats %	Votes %	Votes	+/−
Conservative	22			▲1	81.5	57.2	10,294	+5.5
Independent	3			Steady	11.1	17.3	3,111	+6.0
Liberal Democrats	2			▲2	7.4	9.4	1,682	+8.0
UKIP	0			Steady	0.0	12.1	2,175	+7.8
Labour	0			Steady	0.0	4.0	725	-12.0
West Suffolk Independent	0			▼3	0.0	N/A	N/A	-15.3
