= 2007 North Devon District Council election =

2007 UK local government election

Map of the results of the 2007 North Devon council election. Conservatives in blue, Liberal Democrats in yellow and independent in grey.

The 2007 North Devon District Council election took place on 3 May 2007 to elect members of North Devon District Council in Devon, England. The whole council was up for election and the Conservative Party gained overall control of the council from the Liberal Democrats.

== Election results ==
The results saw the Conservatives gain 12 seats to take control of the council from the Liberal Democrats with 22 councillors. These gains came at the expense of the Liberal Democrats who were down 5 to 17 seats and the independents who fell 7 to have 4 seats. Overall turnout in the election was 40.25%.

North Devon local election result 2007
Party	Seats	Gains	Losses	Net gain/loss	Seats %	Votes %	Votes	+/−
Conservative	22	12	0	+12	51.2	39.8	17,737	+8.7
Liberal Democrats	17	2	7	-5	39.5	42.8	19,101	+0.9
Independent	4	0	7	-7	9.3	7.5	3,360	-17.1
Green	0	0	0	0	0.0	9.3	4,152	+8.6
Labour	0	0	0	0	0.0	0.2	109	+0.2
Communist	0	0	0	0	0.0	0.2	96	+0.2
BNP	0	0	0	0	0.0	0.1	63	-0.2

1 Conservative and 1 Liberal Democrat candidates were unopposed.

== Ward results ==
Bickington & Roundswell (2)
Party	Candidate	Votes	%	±%
Conservative	Rodney Cann*	792	65.3	+14.0
Liberal Democrats	Carol McCormack-Hole*	540	44.5	+10.1
Green	Linda Mack	343	28.3	N/A
Turnout		1,220	34.87	−0.1
Conservative hold		Swing		
Liberal Democrats hold		Swing		

Bishops Nympton
Party	Candidate	Votes	%	±%
Independent	Eric Ley*	728	84.2	+6.5
Green	John Hextall	137	15.8	N/A
Majority		591	68.3	+12.8
Turnout		872	52.09	−17.2
Independent hold		Swing		

Bratton Fleming
Party	Candidate	Votes	%	±%
Liberal Democrats	Malcolm Prowse*	702	78.9	+14.9
Conservative	Margaret Keene	188	21.1	−14.9
Majority		514	57.8	+29.8
Turnout		895	56.57	−8.9
Liberal Democrats hold		Swing		

Braunton East (2)
Party	Candidate	Votes	%	±%
Conservative	Roy Lucas*	653	50.0	+5.2
Conservative	Philip Daniel*	531	40.6	−2.1
Liberal Democrats	Mark Alexander	514	39.3	+5.0
Liberal Democrats	Nicholas Welch	469	35.9	+3.5
Green	Liz Wood	220	16.8	N/A
Turnout		1,312	40.57	−4.0
Conservative gain from Independent		Swing		
Conservative hold		Swing		

Braunton West (2)
Party	Candidate	Votes	%	±%
Conservative	Caroline Chugg	808	57.1	+30.1
Conservative	Jasmine Chesters*	732	51.7	+14.1
Liberal Democrats	Marquerite Shapland*	493	34.8	+0.6
Liberal Democrats	John Hoult	462	32.7	−0.6
Labour	Danny Neary	109	7.7	N/A
Turnout		1,433	43.44	−0.7
Conservative gain from Liberal Democrats		Swing		
Conservative hold		Swing		

Central Town (Barnstaple) (2)
Party	Candidate	Votes	%	±%
Liberal Democrats	Faye Webber*	658	53.3	−1.9
Liberal Democrats	John Wilsher*	584	47.3	−3.1
Conservative	Simon Harvey	446	36.1	+2.1
Conservative	Debbie Lewis	267	21.6	−7.7
Green	Simon Clift	186	15.1	N/A
Green	Martin Hewlett	179	14.5	N/A
Turnout		1,252	33.49	+2.2
Liberal Democrats hold		Swing		
Liberal Democrats hold		Swing		

Chittlehampton
Party	Candidate	Votes	%	±%
Independent	Albert Cook*	578	72.3	+72.2
Liberal Democrats	Marek Donaldson	222	27.8	N/A
Majority		356	44.5	
Turnout		802	43.66	
Independent hold		Swing		

Chulmleigh
Party	Candidate	Votes	%	±%
Conservative	Susan Croft	433	48.5	+4.5
Liberal Democrats	Kevin Butt*	315	35.3	−20.7
Green	Matthew Knight	145	16.2	N/A
Majority		118	13.2	
Turnout		895	50.34	−3.9
Conservative gain from Liberal Democrats		Swing		

Combe Martin (2)
Party	Candidate	Votes	%	±%
Liberal Democrats	Yvette Gubb*	922	55.7	−1.6
Conservative	Susan Sussex	909	55.0	+6.5
Liberal Democrats	Julia Clark*	753	45.5	−4.7
Conservative	Arthur Yelton	534	32.3	+1.6
Turnout		1,658	50.87	−5.6
Liberal Democrats hold		Swing		
Conservative gain from Liberal Democrats		Swing		

Forches & Whiddon Valley (Barnstaple) (2)
Party	Candidate	Votes	%	±%
Liberal Democrats	Sue Haywood	505	60.6	+28.7
Liberal Democrats	Julie Hunt	427	51.3	+21.4
Conservative	Eileen Lyons	210	25.2	+7.3
Green	Robert Cornish	183	22.0	N/A
Green	Earl Bramley-Howard	158	19.0	N/A
Turnout		839	26.07	−3.8
Liberal Democrats gain from Independent		Swing		
Liberal Democrats hold		Swing		

Fremington (2)
Party	Candidate	Votes	%	±%
Conservative	Dick Jones	563	39.2	+16.6
Conservative	John Gill	537	37.4	+11.7
Liberal Democrats	Christopher Pascoe	383	26.7	+17.7
Liberal Democrats	Pauline Batt	380	26.4	+17.8
Independent	Bowser Harris	335	23.3	−2.9
Independent	Charles Piper	255	17.7	N/A
Green	Stephen Barnes	123	8.6	N/A
Turnout		1,453	42.93	+6.0
Conservative gain from Independent		Swing		
Conservative gain from Independent		Swing		

Georgeham & Mortehoe (2)
Party	Candidate	Votes	%	±%
Liberal Democrats	Malcolm Wilkinson*	602	48.1	+2.1
Conservative	Pat Barker	464	37.1	−7.9
Liberal Democrats	Stuart Maskell	461	36.8	−7.2
Conservative	Eddie Short	417	33.3	−9.0
Green	Michael Harrison	203	16.2	N/A
Green	Rosemary Brian	165	13.2	N/A
Turnout		1,254	41.13	+4.2
Liberal Democrats hold		Swing		
Conservative hold		Swing		

Heanton Punchardon
Party	Candidate	Votes	%	±%
Conservative	Andrea Davis*	345	71.0	+17.0
Liberal Democrats	Rod Hawes	141	29.0	−17.0
Majority		204	42.0	+34.0
Turnout		487	32.00	−1.6
Conservative hold		Swing		

Ilfracombe Central (2)
Party	Candidate	Votes	%	±%
Independent	Paul Crabb	594	58.7	N/A
Conservative	Brian Yabsley	493	48.7	N/A
Liberal Democrats	Wendy Butler	313	30.9	N/A
Liberal Democrats	Frank Pearson	313	30.9	−6.0
Turnout		1,013	30.28	−3.7
Independent hold		Swing		
Conservative gain from Independent		Swing		

Ilfracombe East
Party	Candidate	Votes	%	±%
Independent	Mike Edmunds*	386	48.3	+9.9
Conservative	Paul Crockett	351	43.9	+11.7
BNP	Dave Moore	63	7.9	N/A
Majority		35	4.4	−1.8
Turnout		816	42.36	−3.9
Independent hold		Swing		

Ilfracombe West (2)
Party	Candidate	Votes	%	±%
Conservative	Colin Wright	740	60.5	N/A
Conservative	Robert Darell	588	48.0	N/A
Liberal Democrats	Geoff Fowler*	525	42.9	−12.4
Liberal Democrats	Janice Donovan	419	34.2	N/A
Turnout		1,230	34.10	−3.3
Conservative gain from Liberal Democrats		Swing		
Conservative gain from Independent		Swing		

Instow
Party	Candidate	Votes	%	±%
Conservative	Brian Moores	316	53.2	+17.9
Liberal Democrats	Reginald Cane	278	46.8	+12.5
Majority		38	6.4	+5.4
Turnout		594	44.33	−4.0
Conservative hold		Swing		

Landkey, Swimbridge & Taw (2)
Party	Candidate	Votes	%	±%
Liberal Democrats	David Butt*	630	36.2	+36.2
Conservative	David Luggar	621	35.7	N/A
Liberal Democrats	Walter White	603	34.7	+34.7
Independent	Cliff Bell	484	27.8	N/A
Conservative	Robert Street	424	24.4	N/A
Green	Ian Godfrey	222	12.8	N/A
Green	Anna Wotton	162	9.3	N/A
Turnout		1,741	43.90	
Liberal Democrats hold		Swing		
Conservative gain from Liberal Democrats		Swing		

Longbridge (Barnstaple) (2)
Party	Candidate	Votes	%	±%
Conservative	Des Brailey*	895	59.9	+19.6
Conservative	Silvia Harrison	667	44.6	N/A
Liberal Democrats	Andrew Cann	418	28.0	+6.7
Liberal Democrats	Steve Upcott	310	20.7	+0.9
Green	Clive Robins	209	14.0	N/A
Turnout		1,495	41.14	−2.2
Conservative hold		Swing		
Conservative gain from UKIP		Swing		

Lynton & Lynmouth
Party	Candidate	Votes	%	±%
Liberal Democrats	Suzette Hibbert	unopposed	0.0	−88.0
Turnout		0	N/A	
Liberal Democrats hold		Swing		

Marwood
Party	Candidate	Votes	%	±%
Liberal Democrats	Joe Tucker*	416	47.5	−8.1
Conservative	Jim Pile	373	42.6	−1.8
Green	Micky Darling	87	9.9	N/A
Majority		43	4.9	−6.3
Turnout		878	57.95	+2.7
Liberal Democrats hold		Swing		

Newport (Barnstaple) (2)
Party	Candidate	Votes	%	±%
Conservative	Michael Harrison*	623	40.2	−1.0
Conservative	John Mathews	611	39.4	+2.0
Liberal Democrats	Frank Edwards	495	31.9	−7.1
Liberal Democrats	Brian Macbeth*	470	30.3	−9.5
Green	Ricky Knight	450	29.0	+1.7
Green	Amanda Wycherley	281	18.1	N/A
Turnout		1,564	43.61	+7.5
Conservative hold		Swing		
Conservative gain from Liberal Democrats		Swing		

North Molton
Party	Candidate	Votes	%	±%
Conservative	Richard Edgell*	unopposed	0.0	−50.1
Turnout		0	N/A	
Conservative hold		Swing		

Pilton (Barnstaple) (2)
Party	Candidate	Votes	%	±%
Liberal Democrats	Brian Greenslade*	768	59.3	−5.5
Liberal Democrats	Mair Manuel*	727	56.1	−5.6
Green	L'Anne Knight	310	23.9	N/A
Conservative	June Pearson	280	21.6	−8.8
Conservative	Robert Tickell	254	19.6	−9.0
Turnout		1,299	39.69	−1.4
Liberal Democrats hold		Swing		
Liberal Democrats hold		Swing		

South Molton (2)
Party	Candidate	Votes	%	±%
Liberal Democrats	David Worden	664	50.3	−15.4
Liberal Democrats	Susan Sewell*	612	46.3	−12.7
Conservative	Jeremy Yabsley	532	40.3	+8.5
Conservative	Douglas Dowling	430	32.6	+10.1
Green	Jackie Morningmist	199	15.1	N/A
Turnout		1,322	37.40	−10.6
Liberal Democrats gain from Independent		Swing		
Liberal Democrats hold		Swing		

Witheridge
Party	Candidate	Votes	%	±%
Conservative	Nancy Lewis*	511	58.7	+6.7
Liberal Democrats	Kate Palmer	360	41.3	−6.7
Majority		151	17.3	+13.4
Turnout		875	48.61	+4.3
Conservative hold		Swing		

Yeo Valley (Barnstaple) (2)
Party	Candidate	Votes	%	±%
Liberal Democrats	Chris Haywood*	637	64.5	+64.5
Liberal Democrats	Colin Payne*	610	61.7	+61.7
Conservative	Kath Chugg	199	20.1	N/A
Green	Sarah Willoughby	190	19.2	N/A
Communist	Paul Dyer	96	9.7	N/A
Turnout		998	28.88	
Liberal Democrats hold		Swing		
Liberal Democrats hold		Swing		

== By-elections ==
Witheridge (25 October 2007)
Party	Candidate	Votes	%	±%
Conservative	Jeremy Yabsley	448	58.5	−0.2
Liberal Democrats	Kate Palmer	318	41.5	+0.2
Majority		130	17.0	−0.3
Turnout		768	42	
Conservative hold		Swing		
