= 2007 Surrey Heath Borough Council election =

2007 UK local government election

Results of the 2007 Surrey Heath Borough Council election

The 2007 Surrey Heath Borough Council election for the Surrey Heath Borough council was held on 3 May 2007. The whole council was up for election and the Conservative Party kept overall control of the council.

== Election result ==
Surrey Heath local election result 2007
Party	Seats	Gains	Losses	Net gain/loss	Seats %	Votes %	Votes	+/−
Conservative	30	8	0	+8	75.0			
Liberal Democrats	7	0	6	-6	17.5			
Labour	2	0	1	-1	5.0			
Independent	1	0	1	-1	2.5			
