= 2007 Purbeck District Council election =

2007 UK local government election

Results of the 2007 Purbeck District Council election

Elections to Purbeck District Council were held on 3 May 2007. One third of the council was up for election and the Conservative Party stayed in overall control of the council.

After the election, the composition of the council was

- Conservative 13
- Liberal Democrat 9
- Independent 2

== Election result ==
Purbeck local election result 2007
Party	Seats	Gains	Losses	Net gain/loss	Seats %	Votes %	Votes	+/−
Liberal Democrats	5	1	0	+1	55.6	41.8	4,961	+6.7%
Conservative	3	0	2	-2	33.3	38.6	4,588	-15.4%
Independent	1	1	0	+1	11.1	5.4	640	+5.4%
Labour	0	0	0	0	0	7.1	844	-3.8%
UKIP	0	0	0	0	0	5.6	668	+5.6%
Farmer Independent	0	0	0	0	0	1.4	172	+1.4%

== Ward results ==
Castle
Party	Candidate	Votes	%	±%
Independent	Nigel Dragon	547	80.7	+80.7
Labour	James Selby Bennett	131	19.3	+16.6
Majority		416	61.4	
Turnout		678	44.0	
Independent gain from Conservative		Swing		

Lytchett Minster and Upton East
Party	Candidate	Votes	%	±%
Liberal Democrats	Frederick Drane	778	61.7	+9.5
Conservative	Simon Williams	483	38.3	−9.5
Majority		295	23.4	+19.0
Turnout		1,261	39.9	
Liberal Democrats hold		Swing		

Lytchett Minster and Upton West
Party	Candidate	Votes	%	±%
Liberal Democrats	Andrew Starr	734	50.5	+15.5
Conservative	Bill Pipe	720	49.5	−9.6
Majority		14	1.0	
Turnout		1,454	48.9	
Liberal Democrats hold		Swing		

Purbeck West
Party	Candidate	Votes	%	±%
Conservative	Barry Quinn	199	39.3	−32.1
Farmer Independent	Paul Simpson	172	33.9	+33.9
Labour	Jon Davey	88	17.4	−11.2
UKIP	Nicholas Barnes	48	9.5	+9.5
Majority		27	5.4	−37.4
Turnout		507	44.2	−5.8
Conservative hold		Swing		

St Martin
Party	Candidate	Votes	%	±%
Liberal Democrats	Keith Green	568	57.1	+6.3
Conservative	Malcolm Russell	333	33.5	−8.4
Independent	Judith Webb	93	9.4	+9.4
Majority		235	23.6	+14.7
Turnout		994	45.6	
Liberal Democrats hold		Swing		

Swanage North
Party	Candidate	Votes	%	±%
Conservative	William Trite	862	51.1	−7.1
Liberal Democrats	Anita Chennell	422	25.0	−7.4
UKIP	Tricia Moore	221	13.1	+13.1
Labour	Chris Rabsin	182	10.8	+1.3
Majority		440	26.1	+0.3
Turnout		1,687	49.6	+0.1
Conservative hold		Swing		

Swanage South
Party	Candidate	Votes	%	±%
Conservative	Michael Pratt	734	40.0	−6.0
Liberal Democrats	Mike Hadley	539	29.4	+2.0
Labour	Tom Holmes	336	18.3	−8.3
UKIP	Mike Hobson	226	12.3	+12.3
Majority		195	10.6	−8.0
Turnout		1,835	38.5	−2.8
Conservative hold		Swing		

Wareham
Party	Candidate	Votes	%	±%
Liberal Democrats	Eric Osmond	1,243	62.2	+1.8
Conservative	Brian Jaeger	754	37.8	−1.8
Majority		489	24.4	+3.6
Turnout		1,997	42.9	−5.0
Liberal Democrats hold		Swing		

Wool
Party	Candidate	Votes	%	±%
Liberal Democrats	Simon Goldsack	677	46.4	+32.4
Conservative	Rosemary Hodder	503	34.5	−14.1
UKIP	John Barnes	173	11.8	−12.5
Labour	Lena Huskinson	107	7.3	−5.9
Majority		174	11.9	
Turnout		1,460	43.6	
Liberal Democrats gain from Conservative		Swing		
