= 2007 Wyre Borough Council election =

2007 UK local government election

Map of the results of the 2007 Wyre council election. Conservatives in blue, Labour in red and Liberal Democrats in yellow.

Elections to Wyre Borough Council were held on 3 May 2007. All 55 councillors were elected from 26 wards in elections held every four years. The Conservative Party kept hold overall control of the council.

After the election composition of the council was as follows:

Party	Seats	±
Conservative	45	+11
Labour	9	-11
Liberal Democrat	1	0

== Election result ==
Wyre Borough Council Election, 2007
Party	Seats	Gains	Losses	Net gain/loss	Seats %	Votes %	Votes	+/−
Conservative	45	11	0	+11	81.81	63.85	45,877	+13.76
Labour	9	0	11	-11	16.36	28.35	20,366	-10.16
Liberal Democrats	1	0	0	0	1.81	4.85	3,485	-4.15
UKIP	0	0	0	0	0	2.25	1,620	+2.25
BNP	0	0	0	0	0	0.70	502	+0.70

== Ward results ==
=== Bourne ===
Bourne (3 Councillors)
Party	Candidate	Votes	%	±%
Conservative	Don MacNaughton	941	19.58	−3.34
Conservative	Julia Newsham	940	19.55	+19.55
Conservative	Christopher McConnachie	892	18.56	+18.56
Labour	Terry Lees	686	14.27	−12.16
Labour	Alan Dawkins	679	14.13	−11.35
Labour	Tony Condron	669	13.92	−11.25
Turnout				
Conservative gain from Labour		Swing		
Conservative gain from Labour		Swing		
Conservative gain from Labour		Swing		

=== Breck ===
Breck (2 Councillors)
Party	Candidate	Votes	%	±%
Conservative	David Henderson	813	38.35	+2.01
Conservative	Peter Gibson	779	36.75	+1.66
Labour	Sean Hazlewood	283	13.35	−1.64
Labour	Bill Acton	245	11.56	−2.02
Turnout				
Conservative hold		Swing		
Conservative hold		Swing		

=== Brock ===
Brock (1 Councillor)
Party	Candidate	Votes	%	±%
Conservative	Pete Murphy	480	81.49	+12.05
Liberal Democrats	David James Thompson	109	18.51	−12.05
Majority		371	62.99	+24.10
Turnout		589		
Conservative hold		Swing		

=== Cabus ===
Cabus (1 Councillor)
Party	Candidate	Votes	%	±%
Conservative	Robert William Brooks	471	75.72	+20.98
Labour	Bob Hughes	151	24.28	−20.98
Majority		320	51.61	+42.14
Turnout		622		
Conservative hold		Swing		

=== Calder ===
Calder (1 Councillor)
Party	Candidate	Votes	%	±%
Conservative	David Williams	433	66.31	+14.07
Liberal Democrats	Susan Harrison	220	33.70	−14.06
Majority		213	32.62	+28.15
Turnout		653		
Conservative hold		Swing		

=== Carleton ===
Carleton (2 Councillors)
Party	Candidate	Votes	%	±%
Conservative	Jim Hargeaves	1015	35.44	+6.45
Conservative	Frances May Gandhi	982	34.29	+5.64
Labour	Jane Ullah Sarah Jackson	448	15.64	−6.24
Labour	Andy Walker	419	14.63	−5.84
Turnout				
Conservative hold		Swing		
Conservative hold		Swing		

=== Catterall ===
Catterall (1 Councillor)
Party	Candidate	Votes	%	±%
Liberal Democrats	David Sharples	539	65.49	−3.42
Conservative	Val Wilson	284	34.51	+3.42
Majority		255	30.98	−6.84
Turnout		823		
Liberal Democrats hold		Swing		

=== Cleveleys Park ===
Cleveleys Park (3 Councillors)
Party	Candidate	Votes	%	±%
Conservative	Andrea Kay	938	19.21	+4.37
Conservative	Peter Walters	829	16.98	+2.53
Conservative	Tony Morley	802	16.43	+2.72
Labour	Penny Martin	775	15.87	−1.19
Labour	Wayne Martin	722	14.79	−2.11
Labour	John Traynor	687	14.07	−2.79
BNP	James Clayton	502	10.28	+10.28
Liberal Democrats	Frances Taylor	349	7.15	+0.98
Turnout				
Conservative gain from Labour		Swing		
Conservative gain from Labour		Swing		
Conservative gain from Labour		Swing		

=== Garstang ===
Garstang (3 Councillors)
Party	Candidate	Votes	%	±%
Conservative	Dulcie Atkins	1330	27.23	+4.20
Conservative	Alice Collinson	1200	24.56	+4.62
Conservative	Tom Balmain	1055	21.60	+1.90
Liberal Democrats	Thomas Harrison Paul	709	14.51	−0.46
Liberal Democrats	Joseph Purkis Francis	591	12.10	−0.65
Turnout				
Conservative hold		Swing		
Conservative hold		Swing		
Conservative hold		Swing		

=== Great Eccleston ===
Great Eccleston (2 Councillors)
Party	Candidate	Votes	%	±%
Conservative	Alfred James Coop	Unopposed		
Conservative	Susan Pimbley	Unopposed		
Turnout				
Conservative hold		Swing		
Conservative hold		Swing		

=== Hambleton & Stalmine-with-Staynall ===
Hambleton & Stalmine-with-Staynall (2 Councillors)
Party	Candidate	Votes	%	±%
Conservative	Julie Robinson	1252	40.44	+9.33
Conservative	Lynn Bowen	1114	35.98	+7.74
Labour	June Jackson	399	12.89	−8.34
Labour	Andy Meredith	331	10.69	−8.73
Turnout				
Conservative hold		Swing		
Conservative hold		Swing		

=== Hardhorn ===
Hardhorn (2 Councillors)
Party	Candidate	Votes	%	±%
Conservative	Graeme Cocker	1000	39.39	+3.11
Conservative	Frank Turner	954	37.57	+3.91
Labour	Chris Frost	299	11.78	−2.79
Labour	Richard Barnes	286	11.26	−4.23
Turnout				
Conservative hold		Swing		
Conservative hold		Swing		

=== Highcross ===
Highcross (2 Councillors)
Party	Candidate	Votes	%	±%
Conservative	Barry Birch	1066	37.25	+7.09
Conservative	Roger Berry	1040	36.34	+7.52
Labour	Alf Robert	419	14.64	−6.56
Labour	Eric Stafford	337	11.77	−8.05
Turnout				
Conservative hold		Swing		
Conservative hold		Swing		

=== Jubilee ===
Jubilee (2 Councillors)
Party	Candidate	Votes	%	±%
Conservative	Alan Heppenstall	501	18.19	−8.14
Conservative	John Hodgkinson	482	17.50	−7.39
UKIP	Roy Hopwood	465	16.88	+16.88
UKIP	Vicki Hopwood	408	14.81	+14.81
Labour	Kate Condron	368	13.36	−11.43
Labour	Alan Morgan	290	10.53	−13.46
Liberal Democrats	Phillip Pitman	134	4.86	+4.86
Liberal Democrats	William McCylmont	107	3.88	+3.88
Turnout				
Conservative hold		Swing		
Conservative hold		Swing		

=== Mount ===
Mount (2 Councillors)
Party	Candidate	Votes	%	±%
Labour	Ian Duffy	581	28.68	−1.25
Labour	Ruth Duffy	561	27.69	−1.04
Conservative	Margaret Bond	448	22.11	−0.79
Conservative	Jim Laird	436	21.52	+3.09
Turnout				
Labour hold		Swing		
Labour hold		Swing		

=== Norcross ===
Norcross (2 Councillors)
Party	Candidate	Votes	%	±%
Conservative	Ron Greenhough	726	33.41	+8.69
Conservative	Ann Turner	671	30.88	+7.16
Labour	Rita Hewitt	397	18.27	−8.19
Labour	Peter Smith	379	17.44	−7.65
Turnout				
Conservative gain from Labour		Swing		
Conservative gain from Labour		Swing		

=== Park ===
Park (2 Councillors)
Party	Candidate	Votes	%	±%
Conservative	Margaret Birkett	569	27.92	+13.17
Labour	Julie Grunshaw	514	25.22	−12.82
Conservative	Lizzy Houton	495	24.29	+11.18
Labour	Jim Price	460	22.57	−11.52
Turnout				
Conservative gain from Labour		Swing		
Labour hold		Swing		

=== Pharos ===
Pharos (3 Councillors)
Party	Candidate	Votes	%	±%
Labour	Clive Grunshaw	772	20.22	−5.45
Labour	Lorraine Beavers	771	20.19	−6.01
Labour	Ronald Shewan	708	18.54	−6.52
Conservative	Margaret Brock	496	12.99	+6.09
Conservative	Stan Leadbetter	481	12.60	+6.90
Conservative	Billy Whiteside	370	9.69	+4.29
Liberal Democrats	Kenneth Palmerton	220	5.76	+0.69
Turnout				
Labour hold		Swing		
Labour hold		Swing		
Labour hold		Swing		

=== Pilling ===
Pilling (1 Councillor)
Party	Candidate	Votes	%	±%
Conservative	Donald Lawrenson	430	58.27	+6.14
Liberal Democrats	Neil Thompson	308	41.73	−6.14
Majority		122	16.53	+12.26
Turnout		738		
Conservative hold		Swing		

=== Preesall ===
Preesall (3 Councillors)
Party	Candidate	Votes	%	±%
Conservative	Paul Moon	1418	27.76	+7.16
Conservative	Vivien Taylor	1386	27.13	+6.55
Conservative	Gordon McCain	1380	27.02	+4.74
Labour	Darrell Jackson	496	9.71	+0.64
Labour	Nic Fogg	428	8.38	−2.58
Turnout				
Conservative hold		Swing		
Conservative hold		Swing		
Conservative hold		Swing		

=== Rossall ===
Rossall (3 Councillors)
Party	Candidate	Votes	%	±%
Labour	Keith Riley	826	18.16	−4.48
Labour	Marlene Colby	790	17.37	−5.34
Labour	Ted Taylor	737	16.20	4.91
Conservative	Frances Thewlis	632	13.89	+2.86
Conservative	James Lawrence	631	13.87	+2.29
Conservative	Jill Moon	539	11.85	+0.91
UKIP	David Gerrard	394	8.66	+8.66
Turnout				
Labour hold		Swing		
Labour hold		Swing		
Labour hold		Swing		

=== Staina ===
Staina (3 Councillors)
Party	Candidate	Votes	%	±%
Conservative	Russell Forsyth	1515	28.67	+9.70
Conservative	Jim Lawrenson	1433	27.12	+8.29
Conservative	Ramesh Gandhi	1423	26.93	+8.16
Labour	Eddie Rawlings	470	8.89	−5.95
Labour	Billy Glasgow	443	8.38	−5.97
Turnout				
Conservative hold		Swing		
Conservative hold		Swing		
Conservative hold		Swing		

=== Tithebarn ===
Tithebarn (2 Councillors)
Party	Candidate	Votes	%	±%
Conservative	David Bannister	967	43.32	+7.92
Conservative	Peter Hawley J	903	40.46	+6.37
Labour	Kieran Morgan	362	16.22	+0.76
Turnout				
Conservative hold		Swing		
Conservative hold		Swing		

=== Victoria ===
Victoria (3 Councillors)
Party	Candidate	Votes	%	±%
Conservative	Keith Tebbs	1351	27.21	+6.91
Conservative	Michael Vincent	1165	23.46	+3.43
Conservative	Alan Thomas Vincent	1150	23.16	+4.31
Labour	Brian Stephenson	474	9.55	−5.33
Labour	Evelyn Stephenson	472	9.51	−3.68
UKIP	Les Holt	353	7.11	+7.11
Turnout				
Conservative hold		Swing		
Conservative hold		Swing		
Conservative hold		Swing		

=== Warren ===
Warren (3 Councillors)
Party	Candidate	Votes	%	±%
Conservative	Mike Sanderson	890	19.76	+5.92
Conservative	Mark Hamer	821	18.23	+4.78
Conservative	Denise Minto	770	17.10	+5.01
Labour	Margaret Anderton	762	16.92	−4.34
Labour	Malcolm Ratcliffe	660	14.66	−5.56
Labour	Norman Irish	600	13.32	−5.82
Turnout				
Conservative gain from Labour		Swing		
Conservative gain from Labour		Swing		
Conservative gain from Labour		Swing		

=== Wyresdale ===
Wyresdale (1 Councillor)
Party	Candidate	Votes	%	±%
Conservative	Anthony Hesketh	537	72.96	+19.79
Liberal Democrats	Hazel Ronson	199	27.04	−19.79
Majority		338	45.92	+39.58
Turnout		736		
Conservative hold		Swing		
