= 2007 Aylesbury Vale District Council election =

2007 UK local government election

Map of the results of the 2007 Aylesbury Vale council election. Conservatives in blue, Liberal Democrats in yellow and Independents in grey.

Elections to Aylesbury Vale District Council were held on 3 May 2007. The whole council was up for election and the Conservative Party held overall control of the council.

== Results ==
Aylesbury Vale local election result 2007
Party	Seats	Gains	Losses	Net gain/loss	Seats %	Votes %	Votes	+/−
Conservative	37	9	2	+7	62.7	52.5	49,013	+4.3%
Liberal Democrats	21	3	7	-4	35.6	35.1	32,807	-4.9%
Independent	1	0	3	-3	1.7	2.3	2,163	-2.9%
UKIP	0	0	0	0	0	5.1	4,730	+4.9%
Labour	0	0	0	0	0	5.0	4,705	-0.5%

1 Conservative candidate was unopposed.

== By ward ==
Aston Clinton (3)
Party	Candidate	Votes	%	±%
Conservative	Bill Chapple	2,200		
Conservative	Carole Paternoster	2,109		
Conservative	David Thompson	1,889		
Liberal Democrats	Pamela Crawford	653		
Liberal Democrats	Jeremy Hodge	652		
Liberal Democrats	Chester Jones	545		
UKIP	Lynne Roberts	461		
Turnout		8,509	42	
Conservative hold		Swing		
Conservative hold		Swing		
Conservative hold		Swing		

Aylesbury Central
Party	Candidate	Votes	%	±%
Liberal Democrats	Keith Turner	409	52.5	−0.5
Conservative	Sharaz Khan	283	36.3	+3.8
UKIP	Brian Adams	87	11.2	+11.2
Majority		121	16.2	−4.3
Turnout		779	36	
Liberal Democrats hold		Swing		

Bedgrove (3)
Party	Candidate	Votes	%	±%
Liberal Democrats	Penni Thorne	1,601		
Liberal Democrats	Alan Sherwell	1,490		
Conservative	Jenny Bloom	1,478		
Liberal Democrats	Mark Willis	1,392		
Conservative	Mike Arrowsmith	1,325		
Conservative	Andrew Huxley	1,255		
UKIP	Daniel Lewis	306		
Labour	Ruth McGoldrick	186		
Labour	Philip McGoldrick	168		
Turnout		9,201	48	
Liberal Democrats hold		Swing		
Liberal Democrats hold		Swing		
Conservative gain from Liberal Democrats		Swing		

Bierton
Party	Candidate	Votes	%	±%
Liberal Democrats	Jacqui Mallard	387	54.7	+24.5
Conservative	David Carruthers	275	38.8	+15.5
UKIP	Nicola Adams	46	6.5	+6.5
Majority		112	15.9	
Turnout		708	52	
Liberal Democrats gain from Independent		Swing		

Brill
Party	Candidate	Votes	%	±%
Conservative	Michael Rand	597	62.6	+9.0
Labour	Joanna Dodsworth	191	20.0	−3.7
Liberal Democrats	Madeleine Croydon	166	17.4	−5.3
Majority		406	42.6	+12.7
Turnout		954	47	
Conservative hold		Swing		

Buckingham North (2)
Party	Candidate	Votes	%	±%
Conservative	Derrick Isham	832		
Conservative	Timothy Mills	814		
Labour	Ruth Newell	316		
Labour	Pamela Desorgher	236		
Liberal Democrats	Andrew Horton	231		
UKIP	Alfred May	162		
Turnout		2,591	29	
Conservative hold		Swing		
Conservative hold		Swing		

Buckingham South (2)
Party	Candidate	Votes	%	±%
Conservative	Hedley Cadd	820		
Conservative	Huw Lewis	740		
Labour	Robin Stuchbury	561		
Labour	Mike Smith	309		
UKIP	Rhys Paul Ashall	117		
Turnout		2,547	34	
Conservative hold		Swing		
Conservative hold		Swing		

Cheddington
Party	Candidate	Votes	%	±%
Liberal Democrats	Corry Cashman	573	48.6	−10.1
Conservative	Chris Poll	507	43.0	+1.7
UKIP	Nicholas Griffin	100	8.5	+8.5
Majority		66	5.6	−11.8
Turnout		1,180	51	
Liberal Democrats hold		Swing		

Coldharbour (3)
Party	Candidate	Votes	%	±%
Liberal Democrats	Paul Hughes	1,095		
Liberal Democrats	Steven Lambert	1,067		
Conservative	Andrew Cole	959		
Liberal Democrats	Tom Ahmed	898		
Conservative	Mark Winn	789		
Conservative	Talib Hussain	726		
Labour	Neal Bonham	179		
UKIP	Bruce Bolton	173		
UKIP	Ruth Bolton	154		
Turnout		6,040	34	
Liberal Democrats hold		Swing		
Liberal Democrats hold		Swing		
Conservative gain from Liberal Democrats		Swing		

Edlesborough
Party	Candidate	Votes	%	±%
Conservative	Terry Jones	668	59.9	+0.1
Liberal Democrats	Christine Sivers	278	24.9	−15.3
UKIP	Emma Bourne	169	15.2	+15.2
Majority		390	35.3	+15.7
Turnout		1,115	50	
Conservative hold		Swing		

Elmhurst & Watermead (3)
Party	Candidate	Votes	%	±%
Liberal Democrats	Raj Khan	1,173		
Liberal Democrats	Jenny Puddefoot	1,052		
Liberal Democrats	Joan Poole	994		
Conservative	Andrew Gattward	842		
Conservative	Abdul Khaliq	841		
Conservative	Sue Severn	772		
UKIP	Heather Ashcroft	270		
Labour	Mick Rowlinson	256		
Turnout		6,200	35	
Liberal Democrats hold		Swing		
Liberal Democrats gain from Conservative		Swing		
Liberal Democrats gain from Conservative		Swing		

Gatehouse (2)
Party	Candidate	Votes	%	±%
Liberal Democrats	Tuffail Hussain	690		
Liberal Democrats	Kevin Peters	634		
Conservative	Jane Sale	376		
Conservative	Paul Milham	319		
UKIP	Barbara Adams	158		
Turnout		2,177	29	
Liberal Democrats hold		Swing		
Liberal Democrats hold		Swing		

Great Brickhill
Party	Candidate	Votes	%	±%
Conservative	Neil Blake	662	68.2	+11.1
Liberal Democrats	Valerie Twiss	243	25.0	−6.9
UKIP	Gareth Tyzack	66	6.8	+6.8
Majority		419	43.2	+18.0
Turnout		971	41	
Conservative hold		Swing		

Great Horwood
Party	Candidate	Votes	%	±%
Conservative	Billy Stanier	814	87.1	
UKIP	John Thurley	121	12.9	
Majority		693	74.2	
Turnout		935	42	
Conservative hold		Swing		

Grendon Underwood
Party	Candidate	Votes	%	±%
Conservative	John Cartwright	644	75.9	
Liberal Democrats	Christopher Hodges	204	24.1	
Majority		440	51.8	
Turnout		848	43	
Conservative hold		Swing		

Haddenham (3)
Party	Candidate	Votes	%	±%
Conservative	Judy Brandis	1,869		
Conservative	Brian Foster	1,498		
Conservative	Andrew Douglas-Bate	1,469		
Liberal Democrats	Neil Stuart	1,400		
Liberal Democrats	Ricky Jeffrey	1,351		
Liberal Democrats	Patrick Mahon	932		
UKIP	Stefanie Falie	295		
Turnout		8,814	48	
Conservative gain from Liberal Democrats		Swing		
Conservative hold		Swing		
Conservative gain from Independent		Swing		

Long Crendon (2)
Party	Candidate	Votes	%	±%
Conservative	Michael Edmonds	1,225		
Conservative	David Smith	1,094		
Independent	Ann Hooton	654		
Liberal Democrats	Elaine Stuart	373		
Labour	Elizabeth Liggett	264		
Turnout		3,610	48	
Conservative hold		Swing		
Conservative hold		Swing		

Luffield Abbey
Party	Candidate	Votes	%	±%
Conservative	Stefan Balbuza	670	80.4	+4.3
Labour	Patricia Brook	163	19.6	−4.3
Majority		507	60.8	+8.6
Turnout		833	41	
Conservative hold		Swing		

Mandeville & Elm Farm (3)
Party	Candidate	Votes	%	±%
Conservative	Sue Chapple	1,195		
Conservative	Brian Roberts	1,081		
Conservative	Phil Yerby	1,080		
Liberal Democrats	Denise Summers	966		
Liberal Democrats	Peter Vernon	858		
Liberal Democrats	Niknam Hussain	815		
UKIP	Gerard McCormack	209		
Labour	Derek Harrison	195		
Labour	Ron Gardner	184		
Turnout		6,583	39	
Conservative gain from Liberal Democrats		Swing		
Conservative gain from Liberal Democrats		Swing		
Conservative gain from Liberal Democrats		Swing		

Marsh Gibbon
Party	Candidate	Votes	%	±%
Conservative	Jackie Phipps	752	61.2	+14.5
Liberal Democrats	Ian Metherell	476	38.8	−14.5
Majority		276	22.4	
Turnout		1,228	50	
Conservative gain from Liberal Democrats		Swing		

Newton Longville
Party	Candidate	Votes	%	±%
Conservative	Pam Pearce	653	63.5	+32.0
Liberal Democrats	Geoffrey Twiss	375	36.5	+20.6
Majority		278	27.0	
Turnout		1,028	53	
Conservative gain from Independent		Swing		

Oakfield (2)
Party	Candidate	Votes	%	±%
Liberal Democrats	Steve Patrick	626		
Liberal Democrats	Glenda Reynolds	581		
Conservative	Philip Turner	418		
Conservative	Joseph Cook	412		
Independent	Patrick Martin	301		
UKIP	Aimee Gibson	122		
Turnout		2,460	33	
Liberal Democrats hold		Swing		
Liberal Democrats hold		Swing		

Pitstone
Party	Candidate	Votes	%	±%
Liberal Democrats	Avril Davies	775	69.6	+0.8
Conservative	Brenda Jennings	338	30.4	−0.8
Majority		437	39.2	+1.6
Turnout		1,113	43	
Liberal Democrats hold		Swing		

Quainton
Party	Candidate	Votes	%	±%
Conservative	Sue Polhill	630	69.4	
Labour	Tom Quinn	143	15.7	
Liberal Democrats	Harold Newman	135	14.9	
Majority		487	53.7	
Turnout		908	48	
Conservative hold		Swing		

Quarrendon (2)
Party	Candidate	Votes	%	±%
Liberal Democrats	Ray Ghent	412		
Liberal Democrats	Maria Butler	348		
Conservative	Noreen O'Sullivan	308		
Conservative	Wajid Kiani	273		
UKIP	Chris Adams	202		
Labour	Michael Beall	168		
Labour	Gareth Bell	134		
Turnout		1,843	39	
Liberal Democrats hold		Swing		
Liberal Democrats hold		Swing		

Southcourt (2)
Party	Candidate	Votes	%	±%
Liberal Democrats	Freda Roberts	703		
Liberal Democrats	David Ralph	536		
Conservative	Mohammed Khalid	298		
Conservative	Marion Dorrell	289		
Labour	Zard Khan	228		
UKIP	Gavin Richardson	172		
Labour	Adrian Mumford-Smith	137		
Turnout		2,363	32	
Liberal Democrats hold		Swing		
Liberal Democrats hold		Swing		

Steeple Claydon
Party	Candidate	Votes	%	±%
Conservative	John Chilver	373	46.3	
Independent	Edward Griffin	229	28.4	
Independent	John Riches	144	17.9	
Labour	Susannah Cox	59	7.3	
Majority		144	17.9	
Turnout		805	37	
Conservative hold		Swing		

Stewkley
Party	Candidate	Votes	%	±%
Conservative	Janet Blake	unopposed		
Conservative hold		Swing		

Tingewick
Party	Candidate	Votes	%	±%
Conservative	David Rowlands	766	68.9	−4.4
Labour	Paul Thomas	225	20.3	+20.3
Liberal Democrats	Lucy Monger	120	10.8	−15.9
Majority		541	48.6	+2.0
Turnout		1,111	47	
Conservative hold		Swing		

Waddesdon
Party	Candidate	Votes	%	±%
Conservative	Margaret Morgan-Owen	455	48.6	
UKIP	Dave Fowler	380	40.6	
Liberal Democrats	Gareth Davies	102	10.9	
Majority		75	8.0	
Turnout		937	49	
Conservative hold		Swing		

Walton Court & Hawkslade (2)
Party	Candidate	Votes	%	±%
Liberal Democrats	Steven Kennell	626		
Liberal Democrats	Ranjula Takodra	515		
Conservative	Moyra Marsh	339		
Independent	Roger Priest	297		
UKIP	John Wiseman	260		
Conservative	Habib Afzal	233		
Turnout		2,270	31	
Liberal Democrats hold		Swing		
Liberal Democrats hold		Swing		

Weedon
Party	Candidate	Votes	%	±%
Conservative	Ashley Bond	432	70.6	+8.5
Labour	Maggie Ewan	72	11.8	−5.0
Liberal Democrats	Mary Baldwin	66	10.8	−10.3
UKIP	Mark Ferguson	42	6.9	+6.9
Majority		360	58.8	+17.8
Turnout		612	50	
Conservative hold		Swing		

Wendover (3)
Party	Candidate	Votes	%	±%
Conservative	Chris Richards	1,508		
Conservative	Kevin McPartland	1,428		
Conservative	Richard Birchley	1,396		
Liberal Democrats	John Hood	803		
Liberal Democrats	Jane Rutland	776		
Liberal Democrats	Eli Kling	748		
UKIP	John Lesingham	309		
Turnout		6,968	42	
Conservative hold		Swing		
Conservative hold		Swing		
Conservative hold		Swing		

Wing
Party	Candidate	Votes	%	±%
Conservative	Netta Glover	604	71.9	+6.8
Liberal Democrats	Michael Smith	157	18.7	−16.2
UKIP	Heather Adams	79	9.4	+9.4
Majority		447	53.2	+23.0
Turnout		840	39	
Conservative hold		Swing		

Wingrave
Party	Candidate	Votes	%	±%
Independent	Peter Cooper	538	57.9	−6.7
Conservative	Rod Moulding	283	30.5	−4.9
Liberal Democrats	Clive Parish	108	11.6	+11.6
Majority		255	27.4	−1.8
Turnout		929	45	
Independent hold		Swing		

Winslow (2)
Party	Candidate	Votes	%	±%
Conservative	Lindsay Rowlands	1,121		
Conservative	Duncan Wigley	987		
Liberal Democrats	Llew Monger	697		
Labour	Shirley Millichip	331		
UKIP	Paula Davies	270		
Turnout		3,406	43	
Conservative hold		Swing		
Conservative hold		Swing		
