= 2007 Redditch Borough Council election =

2007 UK local government election

Map of the results

2007 elections to Redditch Borough Council in England were held on 3 May 2007. One third of the council was up for election and the result was that the council stayed under no overall control.

After the election, the composition of the council was:

- Labour 14
- Conservative 11
- Liberal Democrat 3
- British National Party 1

After the election, the composition of the council was:

- Labour 14
- Conservative 11
- Liberal Democrat 3
- British National Party 1

== Election result ==
Redditch local election result 2007
Party	Seats	Gains	Losses	Net gain/loss	Seats %	Votes %	Votes	+/−
Conservative	5	0	0	0	50.0	41.9	8,336	+1.7
Labour	3	0	0	0	30.0	29.3	5,826	-5.0
Liberal Democrats	2	0	0	0	20.0	20.7	4,115	0.0
BNP	0	0	0	0	0.0	7.7	1,526	+3.0
Independent	0	0	0	0	0.0	0.5	98	+0.5

== Ward results ==
Abbey
Party	Candidate	Votes	%	±%
Liberal Democrats	Diane Thomas	1,004	53.4	+20.8
Conservative	Anita Clayton	514	27.3	−7.4
Labour	Mohammad Nasir	362	19.3	−13.4
Majority		490	26.1	
Turnout		1,880	46.4	+4.4
Liberal Democrats hold		Swing		

Astwood Bank & Feckenham
Party	Candidate	Votes	%	±%
Conservative	Brandon Clayton	1,085	59.7	−3.4
Liberal Democrats	Graham Pollard	382	21.0	+1.9
Labour	John Witherspoon	350	19.3	+1.6
Majority		703	38.7	−5.3
Turnout		1,817	40.2	+0.1
Conservative hold		Swing		

Batchley
Party	Candidate	Votes	%	±%
Labour	Jack Cookson	837	39.7	−3.8
Conservative	Gordon Craig	639	30.3	−8.2
BNP	Dawn Enderby-New	424	20.1	+20.1
Liberal Democrats	Christopher Hennessey	175	8.3	−9.7
Independent	Isabel Armstrong	34	1.6	+1.6
Majority		198	9.4	+4.4
Turnout		2,109	36.1	+4.2
Labour hold		Swing		

Church Hill
Party	Candidate	Votes	%	±%
Labour	Robin King	824	43.6	−1.5
Conservative	Betty Armstrong	690	36.5	+3.9
Liberal Democrats	David Gee	377	19.9	−2.4
Majority		134	7.1	−5.4
Turnout		1,891	30.9	−1.1
Labour hold		Swing		

Crabbs Cross
Party	Candidate	Votes	%	±%
Conservative	Jack Field	1,017	62.0	+0.4
Labour	Malcolm Beaumont	401	24.5	+3.6
Liberal Democrats	Kathleen Cummings	222	13.5	−4.0
Majority		616	37.5	−3.2
Turnout		1,640	37.1	−0.8
Conservative hold		Swing		

Greenlands
Party	Candidate	Votes	%	±%
Labour	Wanda King	766	37.4	−8.5
BNP	Karl Newman	502	24.5	+24.5
Conservative	Ken Banks	492	24.0	−9.8
Liberal Democrats	Anthony Pitt	286	14.0	−6.4
Majority		264	12.9	+0.8
Turnout		2,046	33.1	+3.0
Labour hold		Swing		

Headless Cross & Oakenshaw
Party	Candidate	Votes	%	±%
Conservative	Carole Gandy	1,464	57.8	+5.8
Labour	Alan Mason	666	26.3	+6.2
Liberal Democrats	John Stanley	401	15.8	−12.0
Majority		798	31.5	+7.3
Turnout		2,531	37.4	+0.7
Conservative hold		Swing		

Matchborough
Party	Candidate	Votes	%	±%
Conservative	Juliet Brunner	860	56.2	
Labour	Roy Vickers	446	29.2	
Liberal Democrats	Simone Rudge	223	14.6	
Majority		414	27.0	
Turnout		1,529	33.8	+0.2
Conservative hold		Swing		

West
Party	Candidate	Votes	%	±%
Conservative	Kath Banks	1,085	64.7	
Labour	John Fisher	383	22.8	
Liberal Democrats	Adrian Field	209	12.5	
Majority		702	41.9	
Turnout		1,677	37.9	−0.1
Conservative hold		Swing		

Winyates
Party	Candidate	Votes	%	±%
Liberal Democrats	Nigel Hicks	836	30.1	+14.1
Labour	Clive Cheetham	791	28.4	−2.6
BNP	Maurice Field	600	21.6	−9.8
Conservative	Jason Allbutt	490	17.6	−4.0
Independent	Richard Armstrong	64	2.3	+2.3
Majority		45	1.7	
Turnout		2,781	42.8	−1.2
Liberal Democrats hold		Swing		
