= 2007 Bury Metropolitan Borough Council election =

2007 local election in England

Results of the 2007 Bury Metropolitan Borough Council election

Elections to Bury Metropolitan Borough Council were held on 3 May 2007. One third of the council was up for election, and the council remained in No Overall Control, with the Conservative Party overtaking the Labour Party as the largest group.

After the election, the composition of the council was:

- Conservative 23
- Labour 20
- Liberal Democrat 8

== Election result ==
Bury local election result 2007
Party	Seats	Gains	Losses	Net gain/loss	Seats %	Votes %	Votes	+/−
Conservative	7	1	0	+1		41.4	22,078	-0.6
Labour	7	0	3	-3		33.9	18,110	+0.1
Liberal Democrats	3	2	0	+2		18.4	9,814	-3.2
BNP						5.9	3,162	+5.9
Independent						0.3	180	-2.2

== Ward results ==
Besses
Party	Candidate	Votes	%	±%
Labour	Alan Matthews	1,138	47.5	+0.0
Conservative	Valerie Morris	829	34.6	+8.5
Liberal Democrats	Fiona Davison	431	18.0	+0.7
Majority		309	12.9	−8.4
Turnout		2,398		
Labour hold		Swing		

Church
Party	Candidate	Votes	%	±%
Conservative	Jack Walton	2,032	55.3	−2.5
Labour	Ben Shatliff	898	24.4	+0.5
Liberal Democrats	Gaynor Clarkson	386	10.5	−7.8
BNP	Julie Kay	359	9.8	+9.8
Majority		1,134	30.9	−8.0
Turnout		3,675		
Conservative hold		Swing		

East
Party	Candidate	Votes	%	±%
Labour	Michael Connolly	1,216	49.7	−3.2
Conservative	Azmat Husain	753	30.8	+1.3
Liberal Democrats	Nissa Finney	296	12.1	−6.5
Independent	Ron Miles	180	7.4	+7.4
Majority		463	18.9	−4.5
Turnout		2,445		
Labour hold		Swing		

Elton
Party	Candidate	Votes	%	±%
Conservative	Denise Bigg	1,555	52.3	+4.6
Labour	Steven Treadgold	936	31.5	−2.2
Liberal Democrats	Robert Sloss	485	16.3	−3.3
Majority		619	20.8	+6.8
Turnout		2,976		
Conservative hold		Swing		

Holyrood
Party	Candidate	Votes	%	±%
Liberal Democrats	Wilf Davison	1,661	54.6	+2.6
Labour	Alan Quinn	698	23.0	−0.1
Conservative	Marilyn Vincent	681	22.4	−2.6
Majority		963	31.7	+4.7
Turnout		3,040		
Liberal Democrats hold		Swing		

Moorside
Party	Candidate	Votes	%	±%
Labour	Keith Rothwell	1,230	39.1	+3.7
Conservative	Angela Crane	1,077	34.2	−6.0
Liberal Democrats	Victor Hagan	505	16.0	−8.4
BNP	Phillip Sedman	336	10.7	+10.7
Majority		153	4.9	
Turnout		3,148		
Labour hold		Swing		

North Manor
Party	Candidate	Votes	%	±%
Conservative	David Higgin	2,411	62.7	+0.8
Labour	Roy Hardy	753	19.6	+1.0
Liberal Democrats	Ewan Arthur	498	12.9	−6.6
BNP	Jonathan Barbour	184	4.8	+4.8
Majority		1,658	43.1	+0.7
Turnout		3,846		
Conservative hold		Swing		

Pilkington Park
Party	Candidate	Votes	%	±%
Conservative	Peter Redstone	1,828	61.3	−0.4
Labour	Steve Perkins	793	26.6	−2.9
Liberal Democrats	Maureen Davison	362	12.1	+3.3
Majority		1,035	34.7	+2.4
Turnout		2,983		
Conservative hold		Swing		

Radcliffe East
Party	Candidate	Votes	%	±%
Labour	Siobhan Costello	1,077	35.8	−0.5
Conservative	Mat Hague	972	32.3	−6.5
BNP	Tom Rosser	586	19.5	+19.5
Liberal Democrats	Michael Halsall	377	12.5	−4.9
Majority		105	3.5	
Turnout		3,012		
Labour hold		Swing		

Radcliffe North
Party	Candidate	Votes	%	±%
Conservative	Stuart Penketh	1,452	40.8	−0.9
Labour	Daisy Johnston	1,373	38.6	−3.6
BNP	Peter Hallows	477	13.4	+13.4
Liberal Democrats	Emma Davison	259	7.3	−3.5
Majority		79	2.2	
Turnout		3,561		
Conservative gain from Labour		Swing		

Radcliffe West
Party	Candidate	Votes	%	±%
Labour	Tony Cummings	1,299	50.3	−4.6
Conservative	Bernard Slingsby	582	22.6	−9.0
BNP	Jean Purdy	503	19.5	+19.5
Liberal Democrats	Mary D'Albert	196	7.6	+7.6
Majority		717	27.8	+4.5
Turnout		2,580		
Labour hold		Swing		

Ramsbottom
Party	Candidate	Votes	%	±%
Conservative	Sheila Magnall	1,766	55.7	−0.6
Labour	Val Robinson	1,007	31.8	+1.8
Liberal Democrats	Janet Turner	398	12.6	−0.7
Majority		759	23.9	−2.3
Turnout		3,171		
Conservative hold		Swing		

Redvales
Party	Candidate	Votes	%	±%
Labour	John Smith	1,172	37.1	−0.4
Conservative	Ijaz Ahmed	1,074	34.0	−1.8
Liberal Democrats	Bill Brison	454	17.2	−9.5
BNP	Eric Marshall	372	11.8	+11.8
Majority		98	3.1	+1.5
Turnout		3,163		
Labour hold		Swing		

St Mary's
Party	Candidate	Votes	%	±%
Liberal Democrats	Richard Baum	1,424	43.0	+1.0
Labour	Keith Grime	1,102	33.2	+5.0
Conservative	Stephen Morris	789	23.8	+0.9
Majority		322	9.7	−4.1
Turnout		3,315		
Liberal Democrats gain from Labour		Swing		

Sedgley
Party	Candidate	Votes	%	±%
Liberal Democrats	Steven Wright	1,402	38.2	−0.9
Conservative	Jonathan Grosskopf	1,148	31.2	+2.7
Labour	Gill Campbell	1,124	30.6	−1.8
Majority		254	6.9	+0.2
Turnout		3,674		
Liberal Democrats gain from Labour		Swing		

Tottington
Party	Candidate	Votes	%	±%
Conservative	Ivonne Wright	1,565	52.3	−4.9
Labour	Jane Lewis	726	24.3	−1.3
Liberal Democrats	David Foss	354	11.8	−5.4
BNP	Stewart Clough	345	11.5	+11.5
Majority		839	28.1	−3.5
Turnout		2,990		
Conservative hold		Swing		

Unsworth
Party	Candidate	Votes	%	±%
Labour	Joan Grimshaw	1,568	46.6	+6.1
Conservative	Nicola Arnold	1,564	46.5	+4.0
Liberal Democrats	Theodor Tymczyna	235	7.0	−5.2
Majority		4	0.1	
Turnout		3,367		
Labour hold		Swing		
