= 2007 Ellesmere Port and Neston Borough Council election =

2007 UK local government election

Results of the 2007 Ellesmere Port and Neston Borough Council election

Elections to Ellesmere Port and Neston Borough Council were held on 3 May 2007. One third of the council was up for election and the Labour Party stayed in overall control of the council. Overall turnout was 30.3%.

After the election, the composition of the council was:

- Labour 24
- Conservative 17
- Liberal Democrat 2

== Results ==
Ellesmere Port and Neston local election result 2007
Party	Seats	Gains	Losses	Net gain/loss	Seats %	Votes %	Votes	+/−
Labour	9	0	3	-3	52.9	47.1	8,639	+10.6
Conservative	8	3	0	+3	47.1	46.7	8,565	+0.1
Liberal Democrats	0	0	0	0	0.0	4.6	853	-7.0
English Democrat	0	0	0	0	0.0	0.9	156	New
UKIP	0	0	0	0	0.0	0.7	134	New

== Ward results ==
Central
Party	Candidate	Votes	%	±%
Labour	Catherine Sherlock	307	42.2	
Conservative	Jonathan Starkey	265	36.4	
English Democrat	Maurice Brookes	156	21.4	
Majority		42	5.8	
Turnout		728	25.7	
Labour hold		Swing		

Grange
Party	Candidate	Votes	%	±%
Labour	Tony Sherlock	669	71.7	+11.2
Conservative	Anne Hughes	264	28.3	+5.4
Majority		405	43.4	+5.8
Turnout		933	23.2	
Labour hold		Swing		

Groves
Party	Candidate	Votes	%	±%
Conservative	Brian Anderson	509	60.7	
Labour	Colin Cooper	329	39.3	
Majority		180	21.4	
Turnout		838	30.7	
Conservative hold		Swing		

Ledsham
Party	Candidate	Votes	%	±%
Conservative	Alan Huddart	888	59.8	+6.5
Labour	Sue Pugh	597	40.2	+11.0
Majority		291	19.6	−4.5
Turnout		1,485	32.1	+8.0
Conservative hold		Swing		

Little Neston
Party	Candidate	Votes	%	±%
Conservative	Scott Mealor	519	45.5	
Labour	Louise Gittins	488	42.8	
UKIP	Henry Crocker	134	11.7	
Majority		31	2.7	
Turnout		1,141	41.9	
Conservative gain from Labour		Swing		

Neston
Party	Candidate	Votes	%	±%
Labour	Andy Williams	546	55.6	+6.1
Conservative	Chris Bale	436	44.4	+6.3
Majority		110	11.2	−0.2
Turnout		982	41.5	
Labour hold		Swing		

Parkgate
Party	Candidate	Votes	%	±%
Conservative	Brenda Dowdings	1,090	79.4	+1.5
Labour	Susan Craggs	282	20.6	−1.5
Majority		808	58.8	+3.0
Turnout		1,372	47.3	
Conservative hold		Swing		

Pooltown
Party	Candidate	Votes	%	±%
Labour	Peter Robson	469	63.6	+18.1
Conservative	Tracy Hardwick	269	36.4	+5.0
Majority		200	27.2	+13.1
Turnout		738	25.2	
Labour hold		Swing		

Rivacre
Party	Candidate	Votes	%	±%
Labour	Angela Claydon	394	57.9	
Conservative	Gordon Meldrum	286	42.1	
Majority		108	15.8	
Turnout		680	23.0	
Labour hold		Swing		

Rossmore
Party	Candidate	Votes	%	±%
Labour	Ivor Jones	845	58.4	+7.9
Conservative	Michael English	601	41.6	−7.9
Majority		244	16.8	+15.8
Turnout		1,446	31.5	
Labour hold		Swing		

Stanlow and Wolverham
Party	Candidate	Votes	%	±%
Labour	Thommy Griffiths	606	65.2	+15.7
Conservative	Simon Harris	324	34.8	+17.0
Majority		282	30.4	+13.6
Turnout		930	22.5	
Labour hold		Swing		

Strawberry Fields (2)
Party	Candidate	Votes	%	±%
Conservative	Kathy Lord	440		
Conservative	Nic Hebson	407		
Labour	Cherie Hill	381		
Labour	Abdul Jilani	357		
Liberal Democrats	Hilary Chrusciezl	250		
Liberal Democrats	Graham Handley	216		
Turnout		2,051	41.5	
Conservative hold		Swing		
Conservative gain from Labour		Swing		

Sutton
Party	Candidate	Votes	%	±%
Labour	Brian Jones	679	53.6	+10.1
Conservative	Karl Hardwick	587	46.4	−10.1
Majority		92	7.2	
Turnout		1,266	29.2	
Labour hold		Swing		

Westminster
Party	Candidate	Votes	%	±%
Labour	Jimmy Murphy	472	68.5	
Conservative	Thomas Hughes	217	31.5	
Majority		255	37.0	
Turnout		689	25.9	
Labour hold		Swing		

Whitby (2)
Party	Candidate	Votes	%	±%
Conservative	Linda Cooper	746		
Conservative	Susie McMillan	717		
Labour	Mike McKusker	618		
Labour	Tony Walsh	600		
Liberal Democrats	Elizabeth Jewkes	220		
Liberal Democrats	Kurt Jewkes	167		
Turnout		3,068	34.8	
Conservative hold		Swing		
Conservative gain from Labour		Swing		
