= 2007 South Holland District Council election =

UK local election

Results of the 2007 South Holland District Council election

The 2007 South Holland District Council election took place on 3 May 2007 to elect members of the South Holland District Council in England. It was held on the same day as other local elections.

== Results ==
South Holland District Council Election Result 2007
| Party | Seats | Gains | Losses | Net gain/loss | Seats % | Votes % | Votes | +/− |
|---|---|---|---|---|---|---|---|---|
| Conservative | 26 | - | - | N/A | 70.27 | 49.50 | 20,043 | |
| Independent | 11 | - | - | N/A | 29.73 | 40.32 | 16,325 | |
| BNP | 0 | - | - | N/A | 0.00 | 4.74 | 1,920 | |
| Liberal Democrats | 0 | - | - | N/A | 0.00 | 3.86 | 1,562 | |
| UKIP | 0 | - | - | N/A | 0.00 | 0.85 | 344 | |
| Labour | 0 | - | - | N/A | 0.00 | 0.73 | 297 | |

== Council composition ==
After the election, the composition of the council was:

↓
| 26 | 11 |
| Conservative | Independent |

== Ward results ==
=== Crowland & Deeping St. Nicholas ===
Crowland & Deeping St. Nicholas (3 seats)
| Party | Candidate | Votes | % | ±% |
|---|---|---|---|---|
| Independent | B. Alcock | 373 | 20.02 | |
| Conservative | P. Przyszlak | 360 | 49.1 | |
| Conservative | J. Astill | 338 | | |
| Conservative | A. Harrison | 337 | | |
| Independent | J. David | 256 | 13.74 | |
| Independent | L. McGuinness | 199 | 10.68 | |
| Turnout | | 1,863 | 29.2 | |
| Independent win (new seat) | | | | |
| Conservative win (new seat) | | | | |
| Conservative win (new seat) | | | | |

=== Donington Quadring & Gosberton ===
Donington Quadring & Gosberton (3 seats)
| Party | Candidate | Votes | % | ±% |
|---|---|---|---|---|
| Conservative | R. Clark | Uncontested | | |
| Conservative | P. Espin | Uncontested | | |
| Conservative | A. Puttick | Uncontested | | |
| Conservative win (new seat) | | | | |
| Conservative win (new seat) | | | | |
| Conservative win (new seat) | | | | |

=== Fleet ===
Fleet (1 seat)
| Party | Candidate | Votes | % | ±% |
|---|---|---|---|---|
| Conservative | S. Keeble | 331 | 48.7 | |
| Independent | D. Woolard | 205 | 30.2 | |
| Independent | J. Baker | 143 | 21.1 | |
| Majority | | 126 | 18.5 | |
| Turnout | | 679 | 38.7 | |
| Conservative win (new seat) | | | | |

=== Gedney ===
Gedney (1 seat)
| Party | Candidate | Votes | % | ±% |
|---|---|---|---|---|
| Conservative | S. Marthews | 369 | 54.7 | |
| Independent | R. Crowley | 306 | 45.3 | |
| Majority | | 63 | 9.4 | |
| Turnout | | 675 | 36.0 | |
| Conservative win (new seat) | | | | |

=== Holbeach Hurn ===
Holbeach Hurn (1 seat)
| Party | Candidate | Votes | % | ±% |
|---|---|---|---|---|
| Conservative | C. Worth | 382 | 66.2 | |
| Independent | A. Steinberg | 195 | 33.8 | |
| Majority | | 187 | 32.4 | |
| Turnout | | 577 | 32.6 | |
| Conservative win (new seat) | | | | |

=== Holbeach Town ===
Holbeach Town (3 seats)
| Party | Candidate | Votes | % | ±% |
|---|---|---|---|---|
| Conservative | F. Biggadike | 1,116 | 47.7 | |
| Conservative | R. Rudkin | 893 | | |
| Conservative | M. Taylor | 868 | | |
| BNP | T. Turner | 665 | 28.4 | |
| BNP | R. West | 650 | | |
| BNP | P. Chapman | 605 | | |
| Independent | M. Howard | 558 | 23.9 | |
| Independent | G. Warrender | 475 | | |
| Turnout | | 5,830 | 38.6 | |
| Conservative win (new seat) | | | | |
| Conservative win (new seat) | | | | |
| Conservative win (new seat) | | | | |

=== Long Sutton ===
Long Sutton (3 seats)
| Party | Candidate | Votes | % | ±% |
|---|---|---|---|---|
| Independent | D. Tennant | 1,321 | 62.2 | |
| Independent | D. Booth | 1,182 | | |
| Independent | D. Wilkinson | 1,180 | | |
| Conservative | W. Dye | 802 | 37.8 | |
| Conservative | C. Jackson | 717 | | |
| Conservative | C. Chaffey | 591 | | |
| Turnout | | 5,793 | 38.0 | |
| Independent win (new seat) | | | | |
| Independent win (new seat) | | | | |
| Independent win (new seat) | | | | |

=== Moulton Weston & Cowbit ===
Moulton Weston & Cowbit (3 seats)
| Party | Candidate | Votes | % | ±% |
|---|---|---|---|---|
| Conservative | M. Atkin | 1,088 | 62.3 | |
| Conservative | A. Casson | 1,061 | | |
| Conservative | A. Woolf | 1,023 | | |
| Independent | J. Johnson | 639 | 30.9 | |
| Independent | P. Winn | 632 | | |
| UKIP | R. Fairman | 344 | 6.8 | |
| Independent | P. Gunn | 303 | | |
| Turnout | | 5,090 | 40.6 | |
| Conservative win (new seat) | | | | |
| Conservative win (new seat) | | | | |
| Conservative win (new seat) | | | | |

=== Pinchbeck & Surfleet ===
Pinchbeck & Surfleet (3 seats)
| Party | Candidate | Votes | % | ±% |
|---|---|---|---|---|
| Conservative | J. Avery | 770 | 42.8 | |
| Independent | M. Bamber | 745 | 43.1 | |
| Independent | D. Best | 718 | | |
| Conservative | C. Bettinson | 675 | | |
| Liberal Democrats | L. Gilbert | 634 | 14.0 | |
| Conservative | D. Moore | 496 | | |
| Independent | L. Tetherton | 492 | | |
| Turnout | | 4,530 | 35.5 | |
| Conservative win (new seat) | | | | |
| Independent win (new seat) | | | | |
| Independent win (new seat) | | | | |

=== Spalding Castle ===
Spalding Castle (1 seat)
| Party | Candidate | Votes | % | ±% |
|---|---|---|---|---|
| Conservative | G. Taylor | 429 | 68.2 | |
| Liberal Democrats | L. Drake | 111 | 17.6 | |
| Independent | M. Brooks | 89 | 14.1 | |
| Majority | | 318 | 50.6 | |
| Turnout | | 629 | 38.1 | |
| Conservative win (new seat) | | | | |

=== Spalding Monks House ===
Spalding Monks House (2 seats)
| Party | Candidate | Votes | % | ±% |
|---|---|---|---|---|
| Independent | A. Newton | 726 | 47.6 | |
| Conservative | G. Aley | 501 | 32.9 | |
| Conservative | I. Baxter | 477 | | |
| Labour | R. Sadd | 297 | 19.5 | |
| Turnout | | 2,001 | 33.9 | |
| Independent win (new seat) | | | | |
| Conservative win (new seat) | | | | |

=== Spalding St. Johns ===
Spalding St. Johns (2 seats)
| Party | Candidate | Votes | % | ±% |
|---|---|---|---|---|
| Independent | G. Dark | 634 | 44.9 | |
| Conservative | W. Seaborn | 408 | 28.9 | |
| Liberal Democrats | N. Hancocks | 371 | 26.3 | |
| Conservative | D. Williams | 361 | | |
| Turnout | | 1,774 | 28.0 | |
| Independent win (new seat) | | | | |
| Conservative win (new seat) | | | | |

=== Spalding St. Marys ===
Spalding St. Marys (2 seats)
| Party | Candidate | Votes | % | ±% |
|---|---|---|---|---|
| Conservative | H. Johnson | 636 | 63.8 | |
| Conservative | G. Porter | 590 | | |
| Independent | R. West | 361 | 36.2 | |
| Independent | K. Brooks | 344 | | |
| Turnout | | 1,931 | 26.8 | |
| Conservative win (new seat) | | | | |
| Conservative win (new seat) | | | | |

=== Spalding St. Pauls ===
Spalding St. Pauls (2 seats)
| Party | Candidate | Votes | % | ±% |
|---|---|---|---|---|
| Conservative | J. Almey | 469 | 59.1 | |
| Conservative | S. Williams | 386 | | |
| Independent | E. Davies | 325 | 40.9 | |
| Independent | L. Swallow | 312 | | |
| Turnout | | 1,492 | 21.5 | |
| Conservative win (new seat) | | | | |
| Conservative win (new seat) | | | | |

=== Spalding Wygate ===
Spalding Wygate (2 seats)
| Party | Candidate | Votes | % | ±% |
|---|---|---|---|---|
| Conservative | R. Gambba-Jones | 642 | 43.3 | |
| Conservative | C. Lawton | 561 | | |
| Liberal Democrats | H. Thomson | 446 | 30.1 | |
| Independent | C. Fisher | 393 | 26.5 | |
| Turnout | | 2,042 | 36.7 | |
| Conservative win (new seat) | | | | |
| Conservative win (new seat) | | | | |

=== Sutton Bridge ===
Sutton Bridge (2 seats)
| Party | Candidate | Votes | % | ±% |
|---|---|---|---|---|
| Independent | C. Brewis | 919 | 70.7 | |
| Independent | M. Booth | 821 | | |
| Conservative | J. Rowe | 380 | 29.3 | |
| Conservative | P. Haworth | 278 | | |
| Independent | A. Sayer | 125 | | |
| Turnout | | 2,523 | 39.6 | |
| Independent win (new seat) | | | | |
| Independent win (new seat) | | | | |

=== The Saints ===
The Saints (1 seat)
| Party | Candidate | Votes | % | ±% |
|---|---|---|---|---|
| Conservative | M. Seymour | 492 | 68.8 | |
| Independent | K. Davies | 223 | 31.2 | |
| Majority | | 269 | 37.6 | |
| Turnout | | 715 | 36.7 | |
| Conservative win (new seat) | | | | |

=== Whaplode & Holbeach St. Johns ===
Whaplode & Holbeach St. Johns (2 seats)
| Party | Candidate | Votes | % | ±% |
|---|---|---|---|---|
| Conservative | M. Chandler | 647 | 51.6 | |
| Independent | B. Creese | 606 | 48.4 | |
| Conservative | J. Hammill | 569 | | |
| Independent | P. Carter | 525 | | |
| Turnout | | 2,444 | 37.9 | |
| Conservative win (new seat) | | | | |
| Independent win (new seat) | | | | |
