= 2007 Watford Borough Council election =

2007 UK local government election

Results of the 2007 Watford Borough Council election

Elections to Watford Borough Council were held on 3 May 2007. One third of the council was up for election and the Liberal Democrat party kept overall control of the council.

After the election, the composition of the council was:

- Liberal Democrat 28
- Green 3
- Conservative 3
- Labour 2

== Council election result ==
Watford local election result 2007
Party	Seats	Gains	Losses	Net gain/loss	Seats %	Votes %	Votes	+/−
Liberal Democrats	9	1	2	-1	75.0	47.0	10,105	+4.7%
Conservative	1	1	1	0	8.3	24.2	5,195	+1.8%
Labour	1	1	0	+1	8.3	17.5	3,760	-5.2%
Green	1	0	0	0	8.3	10.6	2,289	-2.1%
Independent	0	0	0	0	0	0.7	152	+0.7%

== Ward results ==
Callowland
Party	Candidate	Votes	%	±%
Green	Stephen Rackett	935	63.9	+9.9
Labour	Joanna Grindrod	207	14.1	−4.8
Liberal Democrats	David Clay	161	11.0	−4.8
Conservative	Jonathan Cordell	161	11.0	−0.2
Majority		728	49.8	+14.7
Turnout		1,464	28.7	−8.6
Green hold		Swing		

Central
Party	Candidate	Votes	%	±%
Liberal Democrats	Sheila Smillie	639	46.5	+5.0
Labour	Ian Lowery	382	27.8	+1.5
Conservative	Geoffrey Ogden	198	14.4	−1.8
Green	Anna Rackett	156	11.3	−4.7
Majority		257	18.7	+3.5
Turnout		1,375	26.6	−6.0
Liberal Democrats hold		Swing		

Holywell
Party	Candidate	Votes	%	±%
Labour	Nigel Bell	932	50.7	+8.0
Liberal Democrats	Emma Hines-Randall	702	38.2	−6.5
Conservative	Carole Bamford	139	7.6	−0.1
Green	Helen Wynne	67	3.6	−1.3
Majority		230	12.5	
Turnout		1,840	32.8	−6.2
Labour gain from Liberal Democrats		Swing		

Leggatts
Party	Candidate	Votes	%	±%
Conservative	Amanda Grimston	515	28.5	+2.4
Liberal Democrats	Qureshi Fawziyyah	513	28.4	−4.3
Green	Ian Brandon	413	22.8	−1.3
Labour	Marion Chambers	216	11.9	−5.2
Independent	Maria Green	152	8.4	+8.4
Majority		2	0.1	
Turnout		1,809	34.6	−5.9
Conservative gain from Liberal Democrats		Swing		

Meriden
Party	Candidate	Votes	%	±%
Liberal Democrats	Susan Greenslade	896	57.0	+13.6
Conservative	Pamela Bell	305	19.4	−0.9
Labour	Andrew O'Brien	297	18.9	−12.3
Green	Elizabeth Joyce	75	4.8	−0.3
Majority		591	37.6	+25.4
Turnout		1,573	29.7	−7.7
Liberal Democrats hold		Swing		

Nascot
Party	Candidate	Votes	%	±%
Liberal Democrats	George Forrest	1,040	46.0	+0.6
Conservative	Karen Best	956	42.3	−0.1
Green	Sally Ivins	154	6.8	−0.6
Labour	Fred Grindrod	112	5.0	+0.3
Majority		84	3.7	+0.7
Turnout		2,262	41.9	+5.3
Liberal Democrats gain from Conservative		Swing		

Oxhey
Party	Candidate	Votes	%	±%
Liberal Democrats	Shirena Counter	1,167	68.2	+8.3
Conservative	Richard Bamford	361	21.1	−4.2
Labour	Nnagbogu Akubue	117	6.8	−1.6
Green	Caryn Argun	67	3.9	−2.6
Majority		806	47.1	+12.5
Turnout		1,712	34.5	−7.5
Liberal Democrats hold		Swing		

Park
Party	Candidate	Votes	%	±%
Liberal Democrats	Bernadette Laventure	1,377	51.4	+8.1
Conservative	Jane Gregory	1,103	41.2	−2.2
Labour	Manzoor Hussain	112	4.2	−2.9
Green	David Hodgkinson	87	3.2	−3.0
Majority		274	10.2	
Turnout		2,679	48.4	−3.6
Liberal Democrats hold		Swing		

Stanborough
Party	Candidate	Votes	%	±%
Liberal Democrats	Derek Scudder	1,018	62.8	+12.8
Conservative	Peter Williams	331	20.4	−7.0
Labour	Mavis Tyrwhitt	202	12.5	−2.8
Green	Kevin Pettifer	69	4.3	−3.0
Majority		687	42.4	+19.8
Turnout		1,620	31.4	−6.5
Liberal Democrats hold		Swing		

Tudor
Party	Candidate	Votes	%	±%
Liberal Democrats	Kelly McLeod	878	47.9	+3.1
Conservative	Richard Southern	666	36.4	+4.0
Labour	Michael Jones	189	10.3	−5.1
Green	Rachel Neill	99	5.4	−1.9
Majority		212	11.5	−0.9
Turnout		1,832	39.7	−3.6
Liberal Democrats hold		Swing		

Vicarage
Party	Candidate	Votes	%	±%
Liberal Democrats	Shameem Khan	827	42.9	
Labour	Nohreen Hamid	770	40.0	
Conservative	David Ealey	236	12.3	
Green	Tony Pellicci	93	4.8	
Majority		57	2.9	
Turnout		1,926	36.3	−8.0
Liberal Democrats hold		Swing		

Woodside
Party	Candidate	Votes	%	±%
Liberal Democrats	Alan Burtenshaw	887	63.0	+7.1
Conservative	Joseph Harrison	224	15.9	−4.4
Labour	John Young	224	15.9	−2.6
Green	Paula Brodhurst	74	5.3	0.0
Majority		663	47.1	+11.5
Turnout		1,409	28.0	−6.7
Liberal Democrats hold		Swing		
