= Creswell =

Creswell may refer to:

== Places ==
=== United Kingdom ===
- Creswell, Derbyshire
- Creswell Crags
- Creswell Model Village
- Creswell, Staffordshire

=== United States ===
- Creswell, also called Smyrna, Jefferson County, Indiana
- Creswell Township, Cowley County, Kansas
- Creswell, Kentucky
- Creswell, Maryland
- Creswell, Michigan
- Creswell, North Carolina
- Creswell, Oregon
- Creswell, Pennsylvania

=== Canada ===
- Creswell Bay, Qikiqtaaluk Region, Nunavut, Canada

=== Australia ===
- Creswell Gardens, Adelaide
- Creswell, Northern Territory

== Other ==
- Creswell (surname)
- Creswell High School (disambiguation)
- HMAS Creswell, a Royal Australian Navy base on the South Coast of New South Wales

== See also ==
- Cresswell (disambiguation)
- Carswell, a surname (with a list of people of this name)
