= Bolsover District Council elections =

Local government elections in Derbyshire, England

Bolsover District Council elections are held every four years. Bolsover District Council is the local authority for the non-metropolitan district of Bolsover in Derbyshire, England. Since the last boundary changes in 2019, 37 councillors have been elected from 17 wards.

== Council elections ==
Year	Labour	Independent	Conservatives	Liberal Democrats	Green	Residents	Respect	Notes
1973	30	5	1					
1976	25	7	4					
1979	31	6						New ward boundaries.
1983	35	2						
1987	30	2	1	2		2		District boundary changes took place but the number of seats remained the same.
1991	34	3						
1995	35	1				1		District boundary changes took place but the number of seats remained the same
1999	32	4				1		
2003	31	4				2		New ward boundaries
2007	27	7				2	1	
2011	31	4			1	1		
2015	32	5						
2019	18	16	2	1				New ward boundaries
2023	31	3	3					

== District result maps ==
2003 results map

2007 results map

2011 results map

2015 results map

2019 results map

2023 results map

== By-elections ==
By-elections occur when seats become vacant between council elections. Below is a summary of recent by-elections; full by-election results can be found by clicking on the by-election name.

By-election	Date	Incumbent party	Winning party
Shirebrook South West by-election	25 August 2011	Independent	Labour
Whitwell by-election	23 May 2013	Green	RA
South Normanton East by-election	14 August 2014	Labour	Labour
Bolsover North West by-election	8 January 2015	Labour	Labour
Bolsover South by-election	8 October 2015	Labour	Labour
Bolsover North and Shuttlewood by-election	6 May 2021	Labour	Labour
Pinxton by-election	6 May 2021	Independent	Labour
Pinxton by-election	17 November 2022	Labour	Labour
