= Creswell (surname) =

Creswell is a surname. Notable people with the surname include:

- Carolyn Creswell (born 1973), Australian entrepreneur, television host and philanthropist
- Cathy Creswell, British psychologist
- Charles Creswell (1813–1882), English cricketer
- Edmund Creswell (1849–1931), British soldier who played in the 1872 FA Cup Final
- Elihu Creswell (~1811–1851), American slave trader
- Emily Grace Creswell (1889–1931), English artist
- Frederic Creswell (1866–1948), South African politician
- Harry Bulkeley Creswell (1869–1960), British architect and author
- John Creswell (1828–1891), American politician
- John Creswell (MP) (fl. 1597), English Member of Parliament
- John Creswell (sportsman) (1858–1909), South Australian all-round sportsman and administrator
- John W. Creswell, Professor of Educational Psychology at the University of Nebraska–Lincoln
- Joseph Creswell (1557–1623), English Jesuit priest
- Julia Pleasants Creswell (1827–1886), American poet, novelist
- K. A. C. Creswell (1879–1974), English architectural historian
- Mary Ethel Creswell (1879–1960), the first female to receive an undergraduate degree from the University of Georgia
- Michael Creswell (1909–1986), British diplomat
- Robyn Creswell, American critic, scholar and translator
- Thomas Creswell (1852–1920), Australian politician
- Toby Creswell (born 1955), Australian music journalist
- William Rooke Creswell (1852–1933), British admiral

== See also ==
- Creswell family tree showing the relationship between some of the above
- Cresswell (surname)
- Craswell (surname)
- Criswell (disambiguation)
