= Criswell =

Criswell may refer to:

People:

- The Amazing Criswell (1907–1982), American psychic
- Cooper Criswell (born 1996), American baseball player
- Dana Criswell (born 1963), American politician
- David Criswell, American astronomer
- Deanna Criswell (1971–1987), American murder victim
- Deanne Criswell (born c. 1970), American government official
- Jacolby Criswell (born 2001), American football player
- Jeff Criswell (born 1964), American football offensive lineman
- Kim Criswell (born 1957), American musical entertainer and actress
- Kirby Criswell (born 1957), American linebacker for the St. Louis Cardinals
- Millie Criswell (born 1948), American novelist
- Ralph Luther Criswell (1861–1947), American politician
- Robert W. Criswell (1850–1905), American humorist and newspaperman
- W. A. Criswell (1909–2002), American pastor, author, and past president of the Southern Baptist Convention

Other:

- Criswell College, a liberal arts college in Dallas, Texas

== See also ==
- Chiswell (surname)
- Creswell (surname)
