= Cresswell =

Cresswell may refer to:

== Places ==
=== Antarctica ===
- Mount Cresswell, Prince Charles Mountains, Antarctica

=== Australia ===
- Cresswell Downs, a cattle station in the Northern Territory, Australia

=== Canada ===
- Cresswell, a community in Kawartha Lakes, Ontario, Canada

=== England ===
- Cresswell, Northumberland
  - Cresswell Castle, Northumberland or Cresswell Pele Tower, constructed in the 15th century
- Cresswell, Staffordshire, near Stoke-on-Trent
- Cresswell Quay, a settlement in the community of Jeffreyston, Pembrokeshire, England
  - Cresswell Castle, 13th-century stone fortified manorial complex
- Creswell, Derbyshire, in the Bolsover district

== People ==
- Cresswell (surname)

== See also ==
- Creswell (disambiguation)
