= David Creswell =

American psychologist

- Alma mater: Colorado College, University of California Los Angeles
- Institutions: Carnegie Mellon University, University of Pittsburgh
- Fields: social psychology, health psychology, clinical psychology, health neuroscience
- Spouse: Kasey Griffin Creswell
- Doctoral advisor: Hector Myers

J. David Creswell (born July 5, 1977) is an American social psychologist, professor, author, and entrepreneur. He is most known for his work on mindfulness, meditation, equanimity, and stress resilience. He is currently a professor of psychology at Carnegie Mellon University, where he runs the Health and Human Performance Lab. He is also the co-founder and head of science of Equa Health, a personal mindfulness training app.

== Early life and education ==
Creswell was born in Stillwater, Oklahoma to John Ward Creswell and Karen Drumm Creswell. They then moved to Lincoln, Nebraska, where he spent the remainder of his childhood, graduating from Lincoln Southeast High School and becoming a dedicated Huskers fan.

Creswell received his Bachelor of Arts in psychology in 2000 from Colorado College, where he graduated cum laude. During this time he played on the tennis team and worked as an assistant coach and mental skills coach with the US Short Track Speedskating Team at the Olympic Training Center. He then attended graduate school at the University of California Los Angeles (UCLA) where he earned a Master of Arts in 2003 and Doctor of Philosophy in 2007 in social psychology with minors in health psychology and quantitative measurement and psychometrics.

From 2007 to 2008, Creswell was an NIMH Postdoctoral Fellow at the Cousins Center for Psychoneuroimmunology at the University of California, Los Angeles School of Medicine.

== Career ==
In 2008, Creswell became an assistant professor of psychology at Carnegie Mellon University. In 2013, he was promoted to associate professor and, in 2020, became a full professor. From 2019 to 2021, he also served as associate dean of research. At Carnegie Mellon, Creswell teaches courses in social psychology research methods as well as runs the Health and Human Performance Lab. Additionally, Creswell has also been and adjunct faculty member of the University of Pittsburgh since 2014. He has also been a faculty affiliate of both the Center for the Neural Basis of Cognition and University of Pittsburgh Cancer Institute since 2009. In addition to his career in academia, Creswell is also co-founder and head of science of Equa Health, a mindfulness mediation trainer.

== Selected awards and recognition ==
- William S. Dietrich II Chair in Psychology, 2021
- Elected Fellow, Academy of Behavioral Medicine Research, 2017
- American Psychosomatic Society Herbert Weiner Early Career Award, 2017
- Social Personality Health Network Early Career Award, 2015
- American Psychological Association (APA) Distinguished Scientific Award for Early Career Contribution to Psychology, 2014
- Elected Fellow, Society of Experimental Social Psychology, 2014
- Elected Fellow, Mind and Life Institute, 2012
- Association for Psychological Science 'Rising Star,' 2011

== Selected publications ==
- Creswell, J. W., & Creswell, J. D. (2017). Research design: Qualitative, quantitative, and mixed methods approaches (Fifth). SAGE Publications.
- Creswell, J. D. (2017). Mindfulness interventions. Annual review of psychology, 68, 491-516. https://doi.org/10.1146/annurev-psych-042716-051139
- Creswell, J. W., & Creswell, J. D. (2009). Research design: qualitative. Quantitative, and mixed methods.
- Brown, K. W., Ryan, R. M., & Creswell, J. D. (2007). Mindfulness: Theoretical foundations and evidence for its salutary effects. Psychological Inquiry, 18(4), 211–237. https://doi.org/10.1080/10478400701598298
- Creswell, J. D., Way, B. M., Eisenberger, N. I., & Lieberman, M. D. (2007). Neural correlates of dispositional mindfulness during affect labeling. Psychosomatic medicine, 69(6), 560-565. DOI: 10.1097/PSY.0b013e3180f6171f
- Hanson, W. E., Creswell, J. W., Clark, V. L. P., Petska, K. S., & Creswell, J. D. (2005). Mixed methods research designs in counseling psychology. Journal of Counseling Psychology, 52(2), 224–235. https://doi.org/10.1037/0022-0167.52.2.224
