= Listed buildings in Elmton with Creswell =

Elmton with Creswell is a civil parish in the Bolsover District of Derbyshire, England. The parish contains ten listed buildings that are recorded in the National Heritage List for England. Of these, one is listed at Grade II*, the middle of the three grades, and the others are at Grade II, the lowest grade. The parish contains the villages of Elmton and Creswell, and the surrounding countryside. The listed buildings consist of three farmhouses, a farm building, two churches, three schools, and a war memorial.

== Key ==
Grade	Criteria
II*	Particularly important buildings of more than special interest
II	Buildings of national importance and special interest

== Buildings ==
Name and location	Photograph	Date	Notes	Grade
Barn south of Grange Farmhouse; 53.25601°N 1.24787°W	—	18th century	The barn is in sandstone, and without a roof. There are various openings towards the farmhouse, and a doorway at the rear.	II
St Peter's Church, Elmton; 53.25571°N 1.24797°W		1773	The church is in sandstone with Welsh slate roofs, and consists of a nave, a chancel with a canted apse, a north vestry, and a low west tower partly embraced by the nave. The tower has a south doorway with a moulded architrave, a moulded frieze and a cornice, above which is a lunette. In the upper stage are louvred circular bell openings. The windows in the body of the church are round-arched, with moulded arches, impost blocks, and radiating voussoirs.	II*
Elmton Park Farmhouse; 53.24658°N 1.26668°W	—	c. 1824	The farmhouse is in sandstone and has a Welsh slate roof with coped gabled and plain kneelers. There are five bays, the middle three bays with three storeys, and the outer bays with two storeys. In the centre is a doorway, and the windows are sashes with wedge lintels.	II
Elmtree Farmhouse; 53.25370°N 1.24542°W	—	Early 19th century	The farmhouse is in sandstone with a Welsh slate roof. There are two storeys, a main range of three bays, and a cross-wing on the right. In the centre of the main range is a doorway with a shallow fanlight. The windows in the main range are sashes, and in the cross-wing they are casements.	II
Grange Farmhouse; 53.25608°N 1.24808°W	—	Early 19th century	A sandstone farmhouse with a tile roof, two storeys and five bays. On the front are two doorways, the windows are sashes, and all have plain lintels.	II
Infants' School, Creswell; 53.26384°N 1.21156°W		1874	The school, which was altered in 1881, 1886, and in about 1900, is in red brick with sandstone dressings, and a Welsh slate roof with coped gables, plain kneelers, and spearhead and ball finials. There is a single storey and an irregular front of six bays with three gables. The doorway has a round arch, impost blocks and a keystone, and to its right is a canted bay window with a parapet and a gable. Most of the windows are mullioned and transomed, and on the left gable is a louvred bellcote.	II
Former Secondary School, Creswell; 53.26357°N 1.21243°W		1899	The school, later used for other purposes, is in red brick with sandstone dressings, quoins, and a Welsh slate roof. Thee is a single storey and 13 bays. The outer bays are broader and gabled, and contain windows in moulded architraves, the central windows in Venetian style. The adjacent bays contain projecting stone open porches, each with a Tuscan Doric column, above which is a three-light mullioned window, and a rounded gable with moulded copings, broken in the middle by moulded finials. The bays between have rectangular windows with moulded architraves that contain sashes and fixed lights above.	II
St Mary Magdalene's Church, Creswell; 53.26308°N 1.21328°W		1899	The aisles were added to the church in 1914 and the tower in 1927. It is built in red brick with stone dressings, and has slate roofs. The church consists of a nave, a west narthex, lean-to north and south aisles, a chancel with a north chapel and vestry, and a northwest tower. The tower has gableted angle buttresses, a west doorway with a moulded arch and a hood mould, and a stair turret in the northeast angle.	II
Junior School, Creswell; 53.26235°N 1.21678°W		1912	The school, designed by G. H. Widdows, is in red brick with tile roofs. There is a single storey and a V-shaped plan, consisting of two wings radiating from an octagonal hall. The hall has an arcaded passage, above which are gables on four sides, and a pyramidal roof surmounted by a lantern. The wings have twelve bays, and end in gabled pavilions. The windows are transomed or mullioned and transomed, and the middle window of each group of three bays rises to a dormer with a hipped roof.	II
War memorial, Creswell; 53.26168°N 1.21856°W		c. 1920	The war memorial is in a garden at a road junction. It consists of a statue in Portland stone depicting a soldier in uniform. This stands on a tapering pedestal with a stepped and moulded base and a moulded cap, on a square base of two steps. On the pedestal is an inscription, and the names of those lost in the two World Wars and a subsequent conflict. The memorial is enclosed by eight obelisks linked by chains.	II
