= Deep Dish =

Deep Dish may refer to:

- Deep Dish (duo), a duo of DJs and house music producers
- Deep Dish (novel), a 2008 romance novel
- Deep dish pizza, a deep-dish pizza style developed in Chicago, United States
