= Mining village =

Settlement for housing colliery workers

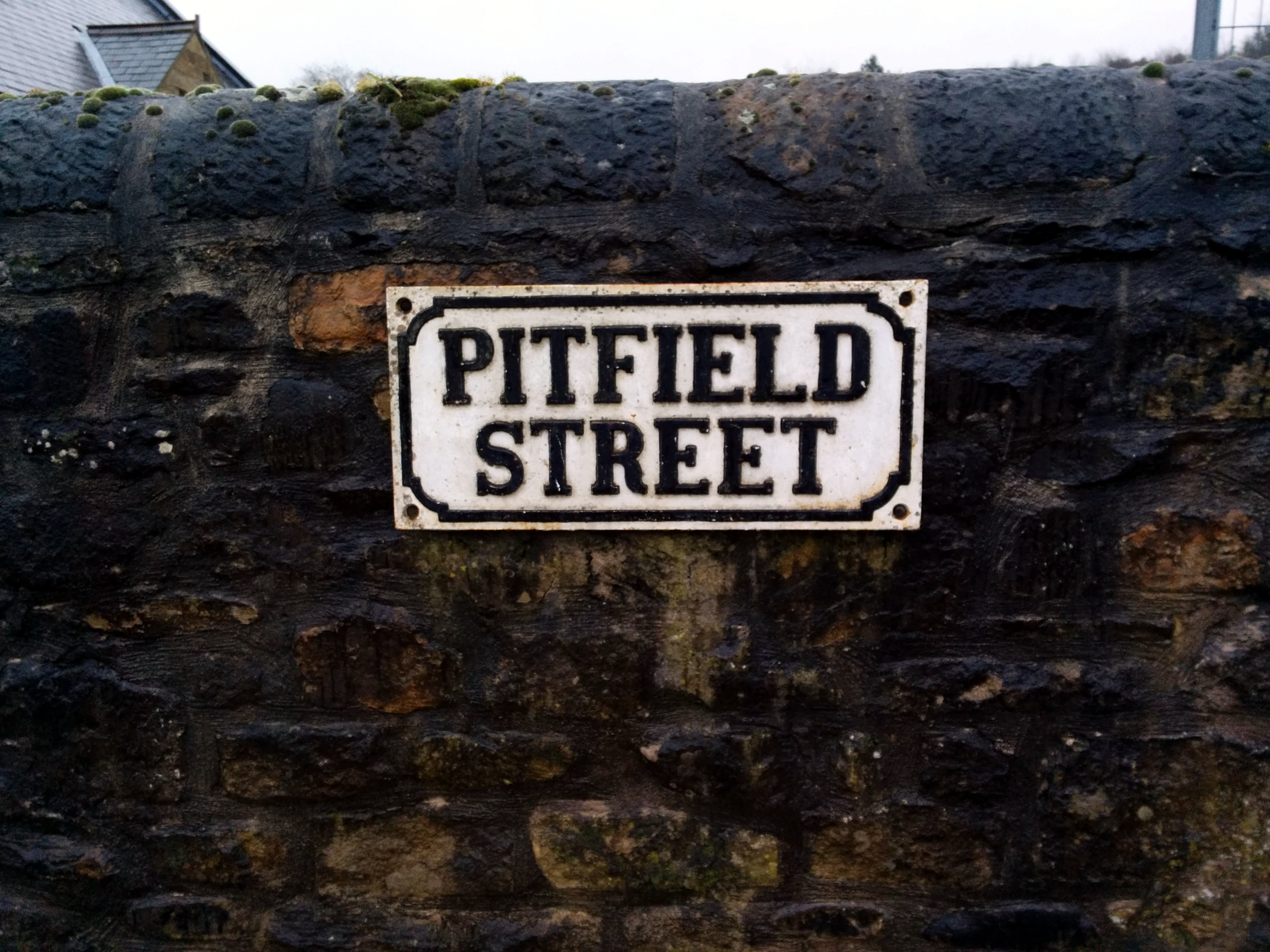
Pitfield Street sign, Pit Village, Beamish Museum

A pit village, colliery village or mining village is a settlement built by colliery owners to house their workers. The villages were built on the coalfields of Great Britain during the Industrial Revolution where new coal mines were developed in isolated or unpopulated areas. Such settlements were developed by companies for the incoming workers.

== Examples ==
- New Sharlston Colliery Village, Yorkshire (1864)
- Howe Bridge, Atherton, Greater Manchester (1873–79)
- Gin Pit village, in Astley, Tyldesley, Greater Manchester (1874)
- Creswell Model Village, Derbyshire (1895)
- New Bolsover model village, Derbyshire (1896)
- Newstead Colliery Village
- Woodlands, Yorkshire (1905)

== In popular culture ==
The 1939 film The Stars Look Down, based on the 1935 novel of the same name by A. J. Cronin, is set in the fictional pit village of Sleescale. The film was shot partly on location at St Helens Siddick Colliery in Workington.

The novel How Green Was My Valley and the subsequent film adaptation of the same name were based in a fictional pit village in the South Wales Valleys. A fictional village in this region was the site of the film The Proud Valley, starring Paul Robeson.

Billy Elliot, set in a fictitious pit village during the miners' strike of 1984–85, was shot on location in Easington Colliery.

Brassed Off was set in "Grimley", a thin veil for Grimethorpe. The depopulation of Fitzwilliam, West Yorkshire was the theme of a song by Chumbawamba and David Peace's novel Nineteen Seventy Four.

A town simply known as Miner's Halt appears in series 5 of Thomas & Friends and seems to be a Mining Village complete with a platform for the miners to get on a train for work.

== See also ==
- Coron (house), a type of house common to mining villages in Belgium and Northern France
