= 2007 Bolsover District Council election =

2007 UK local government election

Map of the results of the 2007 Bolsover District Council election. Labour in red, independents in light grey, Whitwell Residents Association in grey and Respect Party in light red.

The 2007 Bolsover District Council election took place on 3 May 2007 to elect members of Bolsover District Council in Derbyshire, England. The whole council was up for election and the Labour Party stayed in overall control of the council.

== Election result ==
Labour remained in control of the council but lost 4 seats to hold 27 of the 37 councillors. Respect won their first seat on the council after Ray Holmes took Shirebrook North West by 31 votes, defeating the Labour whip on the council, Stephen Fritchley.

Independents also made gains, with 7 independent councillors elected in Blackwell, Clowne North, Clowne South, Elmton-with-Creswell, Shirebrook South West and Tibshelf wards, up from 4 before the election. Meanwhile, the Whitwell Residents Association held both seats in Whitwell, with their second candidate 39 votes ahead of an independent candidate.

Bolsover local election result 2007
Party	Seats	Gains	Losses	Net gain/loss	Seats %	Votes %	Votes	+/−
Labour	27	0	4	-4	73.0	60.8	12,619	+6.9
Independent	7	3	0	+3	18.9	23.5	4,878	-8.1
Whitwell Residents Association	2	0	0	0	5.4	5.3	1,099	-1.1
Respect	1	1	0	+1	2.7	1.4	295	+1.4
Barlborough First	0	0	0	0	0.0	4.5	942	+4.5
BNP	0	0	0	0	0.0	2.0	423	+1.5
Liberal Democrats	0	0	0	0	0.0	1.3	277	+1.3
Green	0	0	0	0	0.0	1.2	239	+1.2

== Ward results ==
Barlborough (2 seats)
Party	Candidate	Votes	%	±%
Labour	Eion Watts	737		
Labour	Hilary Gilmour	566		
Barlborough First	Bridget Ingle	472		
Barlborough First	John Shaw	470		
Turnout		2,245		
Labour hold		Swing		
Labour hold		Swing		

Blackwell (2 seats)
Party	Candidate	Votes	%	±%
Independent	Sally Gray	693		
Labour	Alan Tomlinson	688		
Labour	Clive Moseby	674		
Turnout		2,055		
Independent gain from Labour		Swing		
Labour hold		Swing		

Bolsover North West (2 seats)
Party	Candidate	Votes	%	±%
Labour	Keith Bowman	412		
Labour	Thomas Rodda	394		
Liberal Democrats	Wayne Byetheway	277		
Turnout		1,083		
Labour hold		Swing		
Labour hold		Swing		

Bolsover South (2 seats)
Party	Candidate	Votes	%	±%
Labour	Jennie Bennett	unopposed		
Labour	Alan Hodkin	unopposed		
Labour hold		Swing		
Labour hold		Swing		

Bolsover West (2 seats)
Party	Candidate	Votes	%	±%
Labour	Rosemary Bowler	490		
Labour	Brian Huddless	403		
Green	Michael Milnes	239		
Turnout		1,132		
Labour hold		Swing		
Labour hold		Swing		

Clowne North (2 seats)
Party	Candidate	Votes	%	±%
Independent	Brian Hendry	456		
Labour	Terry Connerton	397		
Labour	Sidney Patrick	374		
Turnout		1,227		
Independent hold		Swing		
Labour hold		Swing		

Clowne South (2 seats)
Party	Candidate	Votes	%	±%
Independent	Paul Hendry	unopposed		
Labour	James Smith	unopposed		
Independent hold		Swing		
Labour hold		Swing		

Elmton with Creswell (3 seats)
Party	Candidate	Votes	%	±%
Labour	Duncan McGregor	1,067		
Independent	James Clifton	914		
Labour	Rita Turner	876		
Labour	Paul Colbert	836		
Turnout		3,693		
Labour hold		Swing		
Independent hold		Swing		
Labour hold		Swing		

Pinxton (2 seats)
Party	Candidate	Votes	%	±%
Labour	Mary Dooley	unopposed		
Labour	Dennis Kelly	unopposed		
Labour hold		Swing		
Labour hold		Swing		

Pleasley (2 seats)
Party	Candidate	Votes	%	±%
Labour	Pauline Bowmer	unopposed		
Labour	Ann Syrett	unopposed		
Labour hold		Swing		
Labour hold		Swing		

Scarcliffe (2 seats)
Party	Candidate	Votes	%	±%
Labour	Sandra Peake	719		
Labour	Malcolm Crane	704		
Independent	Janine Atkinson	523		
Turnout		1,946		
Labour hold		Swing		
Labour hold		Swing		

Shirebrook East
Party	Candidate	Votes	%	±%
Labour	Brian Murray-Carr	unopposed		
Labour hold		Swing		

Shirebrook Langwith
Party	Candidate	Votes	%	±%
Labour	Kenneth Walker	unopposed		
Labour hold		Swing		

Shirebrook North West
Party	Candidate	Votes	%	±%
Respect	Ray Holmes	295	52.8	
Labour	Stephen Fritchley	264	47.2	
Majority		31	5.6	
Turnout		559		
Respect gain from Labour		Swing		

Shirebrook South East
Party	Candidate	Votes	%	±%
Labour	Hazel Ward	unopposed		
Labour hold		Swing		

Shirebrook South West
Party	Candidate	Votes	%	±%
Independent	Alan Waring	376	50.1	
Labour	Paul Harford	375	49.9	
Majority		1	0.2	
Turnout		751		
Independent gain from Labour		Swing		

South Normanton East (2 seats)
Party	Candidate	Votes	%	±%
Labour	Terry Cook	527		
Labour	Joe Phelan	521		
BNP	Eddy Edwards	423		
Turnout		1,471		
Labour hold		Swing		
Labour hold		Swing		

South Normanton West (3 seats)
Party	Candidate	Votes	%	±%
Labour	Raymond Brooks	unopposed		
Labour	Joan Morley	unopposed		
Labour	Sue Wallis	unopposed		
Labour hold		Swing		
Labour hold		Swing		
Labour hold		Swing		

Tibshelf (2 seats)
Party	Candidate	Votes	%	±%
Independent	Raymond Heffer	795		
Independent	Deborah Brindley	692		
Labour	Alison Beckett	563		
Labour	Tony Trafford	367		
Turnout		2,417		
Independent hold		Swing		
Independent gain from Labour		Swing		

Whitwell (2 seats)
Party	Candidate	Votes	%	±%
Whitwell Residents Association	George Webster	631		
Whitwell Residents Association	Vivienne Mills	468		
Independent	Sandy Frow	429		
Labour	Tom Munro	357		
Labour	Frank Raspin	308		
Turnout		2,193		
Residents hold		Swing		
Residents hold		Swing		
