= 2019 Bolsover District Council election =

2019 UK local government election

- 2 May 2019

All 37 seats to Bolsover District Council 19 seats needed for a majority

	First party	Second party
Party	Labour	Independent
Last election	32 seats, 65.9%	5 seats, 21.2%
Seats won	18	16
Seat change	▼14	▲11
Popular vote	13,730	10,430
Percentage	46.1%	35.0%
Swing	▼19.8%	▲13.8%
	Third party	Fourth party
Party	Conservative	Liberal Democrats
Last election	0 seats, 4.1%	N/A
Seats won	2	1
Seat change	▲2	▲1
Popular vote	3,299	1,610
Percentage	11.1%	5.4%
Swing	▲7.0%	N/A
- Results by ward
Council control before election
Labour
Council control after election
No overall control

The 2019 Bolsover District Council election took place on 2 May 2019 to elect all 37 members of Bolsover District Council in England. This was on the same day as other local elections.

The election resulted in the Labour Party losing control of the council for the first time in 40 years after winning 18 seats, one short of a majority. Independents made gains largely at the expense of Labour, winning 16 seats.

Labour regained an overall majority in 2021 after gaining Pinxton in a by-election; the Bolsover North and Shuttlewood by-election was a Labour hold. Liz Smyth, elected as an independent in Ault Hucknall, subsequently joined the Labour Group in 2021, increasing its majority to two.

== Summary ==
=== Election result ===
2019 Bolsover District Council election
Party	Candidates	Seats	Gains	Losses	Net gain/loss	Seats %	Votes %	Votes	+/−
Labour	37	18	N/A	N/A	▼14	48.6	46.1	13,730	–19.8
Independent	22	16	N/A	N/A	▲11	43.2	35.0	10,430	+13.8
Conservative	13	2	N/A	N/A	▲2	5.4	11.1	3,299	+7.0
Liberal Democrats	8	1	N/A	N/A	▲1	2.7	5.4	1,610	N/A
UKIP Make Brexit Happen	1	0	N/A	N/A	Steady	0.0	1.2	357	–2.3
Socialist Alternative	2	0	N/A	N/A	Steady	0.0	1.1	342	N/A

== Aftermath ==
Immediately after the election the council comprised 18 Labour councillors, 16 Independents, two Conservatives and one Liberal Democrat. No party had an overall majority, and the council was under no overall control.

== Ward results ==
=== Ault Hucknall ===
Ault Hucknall (3 seats)
Party	Candidate	Votes	%	±%
Independent	Elizabeth Smyth	565	46.6	
Labour	Patricia Clough	544	44.8	
Labour	Thomas Kirkham	503	41.5	
Labour	Michael Yates	429	35.4	
Conservative	Sophie Castledine-Dack	348	28.7	
Liberal Democrats	Steven Raison	219	18.1	
Majority		74	6.1	
Turnout		1,228	25.32	
Independent win (new seat)				
Labour win (new seat)				
Labour win (new seat)				

=== Barlborough ===
Barlborough (2 seats)
Party	Candidate	Votes	%	±%
Conservative	David Dixon	451	42.0	
Conservative	Maxine Dixon	425	39.6	
Labour	Hilary Gilmour*	395	36.8	
Labour	Brian Watson*	366	34.1	
Independent	John Shaw	238	22.2	
Liberal Democrats	Conor McInnes	116	10.8	
Majority		30	2.8	
Turnout		1,082	32.62	
Conservative win (new seat)				
Conservative win (new seat)				

=== Blackwell ===
Blackwell (2 seats)
Party	Candidate	Votes	%	±%
Independent	Dexter Bullock*	565	48.2	
Labour	Clive Moesby*	455	38.8	
Independent	Debbie Marshall-Curtis	439	37.5	
Labour	Tony Gascoyne	366	31.2	
Independent	Leonard Walker	165	14.1	
Liberal Democrats	Daniel Hay	122	10.4	
Majority		16	1.4	
Turnout		1,194	34.38	
Independent win (new seat)				
Labour win (new seat)				

=== Bolsover East ===
Bolsover East (2 seats)
Party	Candidate	Votes	%	±%
Labour	Anne Clarke	481	66.0	
Labour	Nick Clarke	434	59.5	
Conservative	David Pleming	254	34.8	
Majority		180	24.7	
Turnout		825	25.50	
Labour win (new seat)				
Labour win (new seat)				

=== Bolsover North and Shuttlewood ===
Bolsover North and Shuttlewood (2 seats)
Party	Candidate	Votes	%	±%
Labour	Patricia Cooper	270	54.8	
Labour	Christopher Cooper*	265	53.8	
Socialist Alternative	Elaine Evans	221	44.8	
Majority		44	8.9	
Turnout		545	20.89	
Labour win (new seat)				
Labour win (new seat)				

=== Bolsover South ===
Bolsover South (2 seats)
Party	Candidate	Votes	%	±%
Independent	Derek Adams	601	56.0	
Labour	Rosemary Bowler	418	38.9	
Labour	Malc Crane*	336	31.3	
Conservative	Nicholas Gray-Cowley	163	15.2	
Liberal Democrats	Mathew Waller	132	12.3	
Socialist Alternative	Jonathan Dale	121	11.3	
Majority		82	7.6	
Turnout		1,091	32.97	
Independent win (new seat)				
Labour win (new seat)				

=== Clowne East ===
Clowne East (3 seats)
Party	Candidate	Votes	%	±%
Independent	Ross Walker	984	61.3	
Independent	Allan Bailey	900	56.1	
Liberal Democrats	Natalie Hoy	677	42.2	
Labour	Terry Connerton*	380	23.7	
Labour	Karl Reid*	363	22.6	
Labour	Karen Oxspring	353	22.0	
Conservative	Joshua Yewman	289	18.0	
Majority		297	18.5	
Turnout		1,613	35.69	
Independent win (new seat)				
Independent win (new seat)				
Liberal Democrats win (new seat)				

=== Clowne West ===
Clowne West
Party	Candidate	Votes	%	±%
Independent	Dan Salt	186	43.1	
Labour	Jim Smith*	141	32.6	
Conservative	Neil Yewman	105	24.3	
Majority		45	10.4	
Turnout		437	26.73	
Independent win (new seat)				

=== Elmton-with-Creswell ===
Elmton-with-Creswell (3 seats)
Party	Candidate	Votes	%	±%
Independent	Jim Clifton*	737	58.4	
Labour	Duncan McGregor*	585	46.3	
Labour	Rita Turner*	541	42.8	
Labour	Stephen Smith	373	29.5	
UKIP Make Brexit Happen	Lesley Carley	357	28.3	
Liberal Democrats	Gillian Breffit	160	12.8	
Majority		168	13.3	
Turnout		1,274	27.12	
Independent win (new seat)				
Labour win (new seat)				
Labour win (new seat)				

=== Langwith ===
Langwith (2 seats)
Party	Candidate	Votes	%	±%
Labour	Stephen Fritchley*	Unopposed	N/A	
Labour	Sandra Peake*	Unopposed	N/A	
Majority		N/A	N/A	
Turnout		N/A	N/A	
Labour win (new seat)				
Labour win (new seat)				

=== Pinxton ===
Pinxton (2 seats)
Party	Candidate	Votes	%	±%
Independent	James Watson	405	53.4	
Labour	Mary Dooley*	299	39.4	
Labour	Michael Fox	278	36.6	
No political party	Cherry Drake-Brockman	221	29.1	
Liberal Democrats	Martin Cheung	63	8.3	
Majority		21	2.8	
Turnout		764	23.12	
Independent win (new seat)				
Labour win (new seat)				

=== Shirebrook North ===
Shirebrook North (2 seats)
Party	Candidate	Votes	%	±%
Labour	Jen Wilson*	529	76.0	
Labour	Christopher Kane	451	64.8	
Conservative	Robert Sainsbury	149	21.4	
Majority		302	43.4	
Turnout		722	19.92	
Labour win (new seat)				
Labour win (new seat)				

=== Shirebrook South ===
Shirebrook South (2 seats)
Party	Candidate	Votes	%	±%
Labour	David Downes	340	54.5	
Labour	Janet Tait	320	51.3	
Conservative	Sylwester Zwierzynski	201	32.2	
Liberal Democrats	Helen Oakton	121	19.4	
Majority		119	19.1	
Turnout		647	20.53	
Labour win (new seat)				
Labour win (new seat)				

=== South Normanton East ===
South Normanton East (2 seats)
Party	Candidate	Votes	%	±%
Independent	Tracey Cannon*	457	50.6	
Independent	Andrew Joesbury*	439	48.6	
Labour	Mick Brough	408	45.1	
Labour	Jim Coyle	394	43.6	
Majority		31	3.4	
Turnout		921	25.57	
Independent win (new seat)				
Independent win (new seat)				

=== South Normanton West ===
South Normanton West (3 seats)
Party	Candidate	Votes	%	±%
Independent	Jane Bryson	537	42.0	
Independent	Graham Parkin	510	39.9	
Independent	Evonne Parkin	491	38.4	
Labour	Paul Barnes*	467	36.5	
Labour	Emma Stevenson*	449	35.1	
Labour	Phil Smith*	439	34.3	
Conservative	Sharon Coleman	267	20.9	
Conservative	Keith Davis	258	20.2	
Conservative	Stephen Harvey	194	15.2	
Majority		24	1.9	
Turnout		1,295	25.73	
Independent win (new seat)				
Independent win (new seat)				
Independent win (new seat)				

=== Tibshelf ===
Tibshelf (2 seats)
Party	Candidate	Votes	%	±%
Independent	Deborah Watson*	466	41.3	
Independent	Ray Heffer*	377	33.5	
Labour	Kathryn Salt	371	32.9	
Independent	Shirley Ellks	302	26.8	
Labour	Jane Yates	301	26.7	
Independent	Diane Rutland	268	23.8	
Majority		6	0.5	
Turnout		1,138	36.30	
Independent win (new seat)				
Independent win (new seat)				

=== Whitwell ===
Whitwell (2 seats)
Party	Candidate	Votes	%	±%
Independent	Peter Roberts	577	63.0	
Labour	Tom Munro*	381	41.6	
Labour	Malcolm Ritchie*	305	33.3	
Conservative	Paul Hogg	195	21.3	
Majority		76	8.3	
Turnout		932	31.11	
Independent win (new seat)				
Labour win (new seat)				

== Changes 2019–2023 ==
- 6 May 2021: Labour held Bolsover North and Shuttlewood in a by-election.
- 6 May 2021: Labour gained Pinxton from the Independents in a by-election, restoring Labour's overall majority.
- 2021: Elizabeth Smyth, elected as an independent in Ault Hucknall, joined the Labour Group, increasing its majority to two.
- 17 November 2022: Mark Hinman was elected for Labour in a Pinxton by-election, holding the seat for Labour.
- 7 December 2022: The council recorded that Dan Salt was no longer a member under section 85 of the Local Government Act 1972; because of the electoral timetable, the Clowne West vacancy was held until May 2023 without a by-election.

=== By-elections ===
==== Bolsover North and Shuttlewood ====
Bolsover North and Shuttlewood by-election 6 May 2021
Party	Candidate	Votes	%	±%
Labour	Donna Marie Hales	351	51.5	
Conservative	Matthew Sean Hoy	254	37.3	
Independent	Martin George Sanders	38	5.6	
TUSC	Elaine Ann Evans	38	5.6	
Majority		97	14.2	
Turnout		685	25.29	
Labour hold		Swing		

The Bolsover North and Shuttlewood by-election in 2021 was triggered by the death of Labour councillor Pat Cooper.

==== Pinxton ====
Pinxton by-election 6 May 2021
Party	Candidate	Votes	%	±%
Labour	Stan Fox	442	49.4	
Conservative	Sarah Smith	299	33.4	
Independent	Kevin John Rose	140	15.6	
Liberal Democrats	Helen Oakton	14	1.6	
Majority		143	16.0	
Turnout		901	26.96	
Labour gain from Independent		Swing		

The Pinxton by-election in 2021 was triggered by the death of independent councillor James Watson.

==== Pinxton ====
Pinxton by-election 17 November 2022
Party	Candidate	Votes	%	±%
Labour	Mark Hinman	376	63.3	
Conservative	Julian Siddle	218	36.7	
Majority		158	26.6	
Labour hold		Swing		

The Pinxton by-election in 2022 was triggered by the resignation of Labour councillor Stan Fox.
