= Cresswell (surname) =

Cresswell is a surname. Notable people with the surname include:

- Aaron Cresswell (born 1989), English footballer
- Addison Cresswell (1960–2013), British talent agent
- Arthur Cresswell (1917–2002), New Zealand cricketer, brother of Fen Cresswell
- Brad Cresswell, American radio broadcaster and former opera singer
- Chanel Cresswell (born 1990), English BAFTA award-winning actress
- Cresswell Cresswell (1794–1863), English judge and politician
- D'Arcy Cresswell (1896–1960), New Zealand poet and memoirist
- Daryn Cresswell (born 1971), Australian rules footballer
- Douglas Cresswell (1894–1960), New Zealand historian and broadcaster
- Elijah Cresswell (1889–1931), Scottish footballer
- Estcourt Cresswell (1745–1823), English politician
- Fen Cresswell (1915–1966), New Zealand cricketer
- Helen Cresswell (1934–2005), British writer
- Ian Cresswell (born 1968), Australian composer
- Luke Cresswell (born 1963), English co-creator of dance percussion act Stomp
- Lyell Cresswell (1944–2022), New Zealand-born composer based in Scotland
- Max Cresswell (1939–2024), New Zealand philosopher and logician
- Peter Cresswell (immunologist) (born 1945), British immunologist
- Sir Peter Cresswell (judge) (1944–2025), English High Court judge
- Richard Cresswell (born 1977), English footballer
- Richard Cresswell (MP) (1688–1743) English Member of Parliament
- Thomas Estcourt Cresswell (1712–1788), English Member of Parliament
- Tim Cresswell (born 1965), British geographer
- Warney Cresswell (1897–1973), English footballer and football manager
- William Nichol Cresswell (1818–1888), British-Canadian painter

- Gordon Cresswell, fictional character from JAG

== See also ==
- Creswell (surname)
- Craswell (surname)
