= Mary Kay Andrews =

American writer (born 1954)

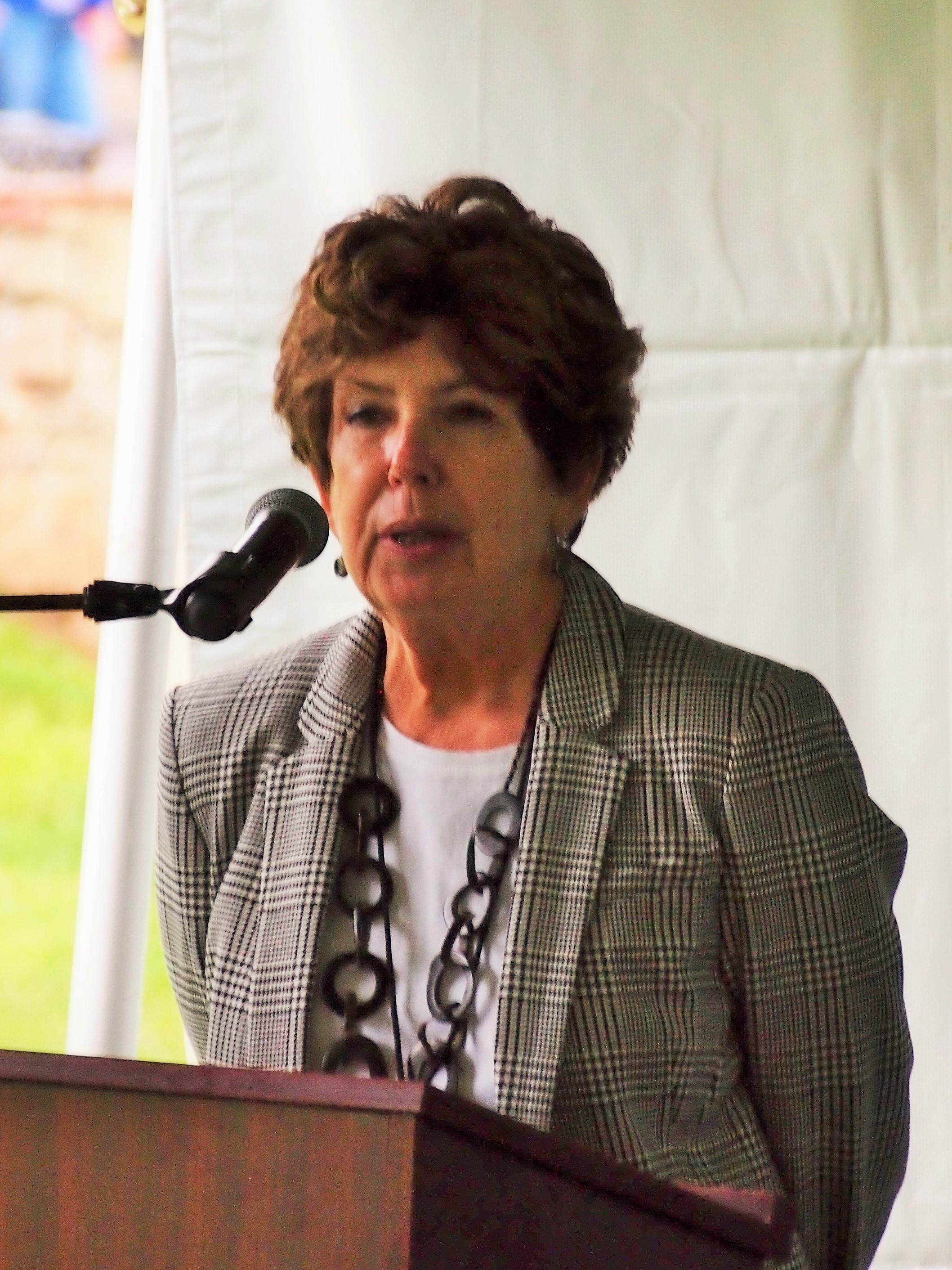
- Andrews reading at the Gaithersburg Book Festival in 2016
- Education: University of Georgia
- Occupation: Writer
- Writing career
- Pen name: Mary Kay Andrews
- Website: marykayandrews.com

Mary Kay Andrews (born July 27, 1954) is the pen name of American writer Kathy Hogan Trocheck, based in Atlanta, Georgia, who has authored a number of best-selling books under the Andrews pen name since 2002.

Trocheck graduated from the University of Georgia with a journalism degree in 1976. She worked as a reporter at a number of papers, and spent 11 years as a reporter for the Atlanta Journal-Constitution before leaving to write fiction full-time in 1991. She published ten mystery novels under her own name between 1992 and 2000, and switched to the Andrews pen name in 2002 to author Savannah Blues, which marked a change in her style to more Southern-flavored themes. Her pen name is inspired by the names of her children, Mary Kathleen and Andrew Trocheck.

== Bibliography ==
=== Writing as Kathy Hogan Trocheck ===
- Every Crooked Nanny (1992) (Callahan Garrity main character)
- To Live and Die in Dixie (1993) (Garrity)
- Homemade Sin (1994) (Garrity)
- Happy Never After (1995) (Garrity)
- Heart Trouble (1996) (Garrity)
- Lickety Split (1996) (Truman Kicklighter main character)
- Strange Brew (1997) (Garrity)
- Crash Course (1997) (Kicklighter)
- Midnight Clear (1998) (Garrity)
- Irish Eyes (2000)

=== Writing as Mary Kay Andrews ===
- Savannah Blues (2002)
- Little Bitty Lies (2003)
- Hissy Fit (2004)
- Savannah Breeze (2006)
- Blue Christmas (2006)
- Deep Dish (2008)
- The Fixer Upper (2009)
- Summer Rental (2011)
- Spring Fever (2012)
- Ladies' Night (2013)
- Christmas Bliss (2013)
- Save the Date (2014)
- Beach Town (2015)
- The Weekenders (2016)
- The High Tide Club (2018)
- Sunset Beach (2019)
- Hello, Summer (2020)
- The Newcomer (2021)
- The Santa Suit (2021)
- The Homewreckers (2022)
- Bright Lights, Big Christmas (2023)
- Summers at the Saint (2024)
- Road Trip (2026)
