= Deep Dish (novel) =

2008 romance novel by Mary Kay Andrews

- Author: Mary Kay Andrews
- Language: English
- Publication date: 2008

Deep Dish is a 2008 romance novel by the American writer Mary Kay Andrews.

== Plot ==
Gina is a 30-year-old chef obsessed with using fresh, wholesome, high-quality ingredients in the food she prepares. Her cooking show is cancelled when a big sponsor pulls out after seeing the show's producer in bed with the sponsor's wife. This cancellation creates an opportunity for a new show on the Cooking Channel. The producers are also interested in a local cooking show called Vittles, hosted by Tate Moody. The producers decide to turn the competition between Gina and Tate into a reality show.

== Reception ==
A Publishers Weekly review says, "The close quarters and competition create the right atmosphere for the two chefs to fall in love, though things never get too racy. Andrews takes a long time to get the romance off the ground, but when it starts moving, it moves fast.". Shelley Mosley, of Library Journal, reviewed the book saying, "Readers with a taste for delectable culinary romances like Millie Criswell's The Trouble with Mary, Susan Mallery's Delicious, and Deirdre Martin's Just a Taste will enjoy Deep Dish. Sarrah Knight, of The Romance Reader, reviewed the book saying, "As always, Andrews has delivered a mouth-watering novel that, while it doesn't move the way her previous novels have, is sure to satisfy".
