= Socialist Alternative =

Socialist Alternative can refer to any of several left-wing politics political organizations, many affiliated to the International Socialist Alternative or Reunified Fourth International.

| Country / Region | Organization | International affiliation |
|---|---|---|
| Australia | Socialist Alternative | None |
| Austria | Sozialistische Alternative | Reunified Fourth International |
| Canada | Socialist Alternative | International Socialist Alternative |
| Finland | Sosialistinen Vaihtoehto | International Socialist Alternative |
| France | Alternative socialiste | Former tendency of the Socialist Party |
| Germany | Sozialistische Alternative | International Socialist Alternative |
| Malaysia | Sosialis Alternatif | Committee for a Workers' International (Refounded) |
| Netherlands | Socialistisch Alternatief | International Socialist Alternative |
| Poland | Alternatywa Socjalistyczna | International Socialist Alternative |
| Quebec | Alternative socialiste | International Socialist Alternative |
| Russia | Социалистическая Альтернатива | International Socialist Alternative |
| Spain | Alterativa Socialista | Unión Socialistas |
| Sweden | Socialist Alternative | International Socialist Alternative |
| Turkey | Sosyalist Alternatif | International Socialist Alternative |
| United Kingdom | Socialist Alternative (England, Wales & Scotland) Socialist Party also use the name Socialist Alternative when independently contesting elections | International Socialist Alternative Committee for a Workers' International (Refounded) |
| United States | Socialist Alternative | International Socialist Alternative |

== See also ==
- Alternativa Socialista Revolucionaria, Bolivian section of the CWI
- New Socialist Alternative, Indian section of the CWI
- Socialistická alternativa Budoucnost, Czech section of the CWI
- Socialistische Partij Anders, the Belgian Flemish social-democratic party
- Socialist Voice (New Zealand), previously known as Socialist Alternative
- Socialist Alternatives, a defunct political magazine linked with the International Revolutionary Marxist Tendency
