= Creswell Model Village =

Coordinates: 53.260°N 1.220°W

- The houses that make up the Model Village display a range of decorative roofing styles.

- Location within Derbyshire
- OS grid reference: SK521739
- District: Bolsover
- Shire county: Derbyshire
- Region: East Midlands
- Country: England
- Sovereign state: United Kingdom
- Post town: WORKSOP
- Postcode district: S80
- Police: Derbyshire
- Fire: Derbyshire
- Ambulance: East Midlands

Creswell Model Village is an arts and crafts style model village in the village of Creswell, Derbyshire, England. The pit village was built in 1895 by the Bolsover Colliery Company to designs by architect Percy B. Houfton for the workers of Creswell Colliery on land leased from the Welbeck Estate. Influenced by garden village principles, it provided the workers with modern facilities; it had a tramway to deliver coal to the houses. Designed around a large oval village green with an access road through the centre, the houses are of varying styles. The Model as it is known, has been refurbished.

The village is within the parish of Elmton-with-Creswell in the district of Bolsover in northeast Derbyshire.

== History ==
The Bolsover Colliery Company acquired ten acres of land in Creswell from the Duke of Portland on which to build a village to house its colliery employees. The village comprises 280 cottages built in two circles, an inner and an outer, around a large green with shrubberies and a bandstand. The inner-circle cottages faced the green and their back yards faced those of the outer circle. All the houses were of two storeys and had five or six rooms and were lit by electricity. All the houses had small front gardens facing either the green or surrounding the outer circle. Between the circles was a 15-yard road with a tram track used to transport coal to the colliers' cellars. In the back yards were enclosed ashpit lavatories that were emptied weekly at night by staff employed by the colliery company. The night soil was taken away on the tram line.

The company built the village institute or club between the houses and the colliery. In addition to its bar and billiard room, it had a reading room and library, and a lecture room capable of seating 400 people where the colliery brass band practised. A branch of the Bolsover Co-operative Society opened its store in the village and hawkers brought fish and fresh fruit for sale. Allotments and a cricket ground were provided adjacent to the village.

The Duke of Portland and his wife took a great interest in the village. The Duchess of Portland paid for a nurse to look after the residents. He built the church, dedicated to St Mary Magdalene, which was lit by electricity generated by the colliery. The duke and the colliery company also built the local school. The Methodist congregation built a chapel in the village and the Wesleyans met in the lecture room until they had premises of their own.

Most of the colliery employees lived outside the village and used the workmen's stopping trains that ran to Creswell railway station from Mansfield.

== See also ==
- Creswell, Derbyshire
- Creswell Crags
