= 2003 Bolsover District Council election =

2003 UK local government election

Map of the results of the 2003 Bolsover District Council election. Labour in red, independents in light grey and Whitwell Residents Association in grey.

The 2003 Bolsover District Council election took place on 1 May 2003 to elect members of Bolsover District Council in Derbyshire, England. The whole council was up for election after boundary changes and the Labour Party stayed in overall control of the council.

== Election result ==
Labour won 31 of the 37 seats on the council to keep a 25-seat majority on the council. Of the other 6 seats, 4 were won by independents, while the remaining 2 seats were taken by the Whitwell Residents Association, which won both seats in Whitwell ward. Overall turnout at the election was about 30%, reaching a high of 42.4% in Elmton-with-Creswell.

Bolsover local election result 2003
Party	Seats	Gains	Losses	Net gain/loss	Seats %	Votes %	Votes	+/−
Labour	31			-1	83.8	53.9	11,568	
Independent	4			0	10.8	31.6	6,791	
Whitwell Residents Association	2			+1	5.4	6.4	1,373	
Conservative	0			0	0.0	7.2	1,544	
BNP	0			0	0.0	0.5	101	
Socialist Alliance	0			0	0.0	0.5	97	

== Ward results ==
Barlborough (2 seats)
Party	Candidate	Votes	%	±%
Labour	John Shaw	unopposed		
Labour	Eion Watts	unopposes		

Blackwell (2 seats)
Party	Candidate	Votes	%	±%
Labour	Clive Moesby	710		
Labour	Alan Tomlinson	631		
Independent	Sally Gray	517		
Turnout		1,858		

Bolsover North West (2 seats)
Party	Candidate	Votes	%	±%
Labour	Keith Bowman	unopposed		
Labour	Thomas Rodda	unopposed		

Bolsover South (2 seats)
Party	Candidate	Votes	%	±%
Labour	Jennie Bennett	unopposed		
Labour	Alan Hodkin	unopposed		

Bolsover West (2 seats)
Party	Candidate	Votes	%	±%
Labour	Rosemary Bowler	unopposed		
Labour	Bran Huddless	unopposed		

Clowne North (2 seats)
Party	Candidate	Votes	%	±%
Independent	Brian Hendry	415		
Labour	Sidney Patrick	373		
Labour	Duncan Haywood	306		
Independent	Andrew Patterson	272		
Turnout		1,366		

Clowne South (2 seats)
Party	Candidate	Votes	%	±%
Independent	Paul Hendry	435		
Labour	James Smith	375		
Labour	Peter Linley	372		
Turnout		1,182		

Elmton-with-Creswell (3 seats)
Party	Candidate	Votes	%	±%
Labour	Duncan McGregor	1,002		
Independent	James Clifton	883		
Labour	Rita Turner	777		
Independent	Shaun Wass	766		
Labour	Enid Glassey	656		
Independent	Shirley Staniforth	575		
Independent	Robert Davis	261		
Turnout		4,920	42.4	

Pinxton (2 seats)
Party	Candidate	Votes	%	±%
Labour	Mary Dooley	534		
Labour	Dennis Kelly	476		
Independent	Leonard Worrall	386		
Turnout		1,396		

Pleasley (2 seats)
Party	Candidate	Votes	%	±%
Labour	Pauline Bowmer	unopposed		
Labour	Ann Syrett	unopposed		

Scarcliffe (2 seats)
Party	Candidate	Votes	%	±%
Labour	Sandra Peake	688		
Labour	Malcolm Crane	591		
Independent	Celso Sabido	530		
BNP	Mark Stringfellow	101		
Socialist Alliance	Raymond Holmes	97		
Turnout		2,007		

Shirebrook East
Party	Candidate	Votes	%	±%
Labour	Brian Murray-Carr	unopposed		

Shirebrook Langwith
Party	Candidate	Votes	%	±%
Labour	Kenneth Walker	unopposed		

Shirebrook North West
Party	Candidate	Votes	%	±%
Labour	Martin Dawkins	unopposed		

Shirebrook South East
Party	Candidate	Votes	%	±%
Labour	Hazel Ward	unopposed		

Shirebrook South West
Party	Candidate	Votes	%	±%
Labour	Stephen Fritchley	unopposed		

South Normanton East (2 seats)
Party	Candidate	Votes	%	±%
Labour	Terry Cook	448		
Labour	Malcolm Hodges	396		
Conservative	Anne Smith	218		
Conservative	Keith Smith	190		
Turnout		1,252		

South Normanton West (3 seats)
Party	Candidate	Votes	%	±%
Labour	Trevor Lane	496		
Labour	Joan Morley	484		
Labour	John Phelan	470		
Conservative	Susan Curry	425		
Independent	John Hudson	404		
Conservative	David Blythe	378		
Conservative	Paul Smith	333		
Turnout		2,990		

Tibshelf (2 seats)
Party	Candidate	Votes	%	±%
Independent	Michael Coupe	734		
Labour	Alison Beckett	622		
Independent	Raymond Heffer	613		
Labour	Graham Parkin	360		
Turnout		2,329		

Whitwell (2 seats)
Party	Candidate	Votes	%	±%
Whitwell Residents Association	George Webster	755		
Whitwell Residents Association	Vivienne Mills	618		
Labour	Dennis Reynolds	428		
Labour	Kenneth Stevenson	373		
Turnout		2,174		
