= Craswell (surname) =

Craswell is a surname. Notable people with the surname include:

- Dennis Craswell (born 1948), American singer, songwriter, and actor
- Ellen Craswell (1932–2008), American politician

== See also ==
- Creswell (surname)
- Cresswell (surname)
