= Elmton with Creswell =

Civil parish in Derbyshire, England

Coordinates: 53.26°N 1.22°W

- Civil Parish
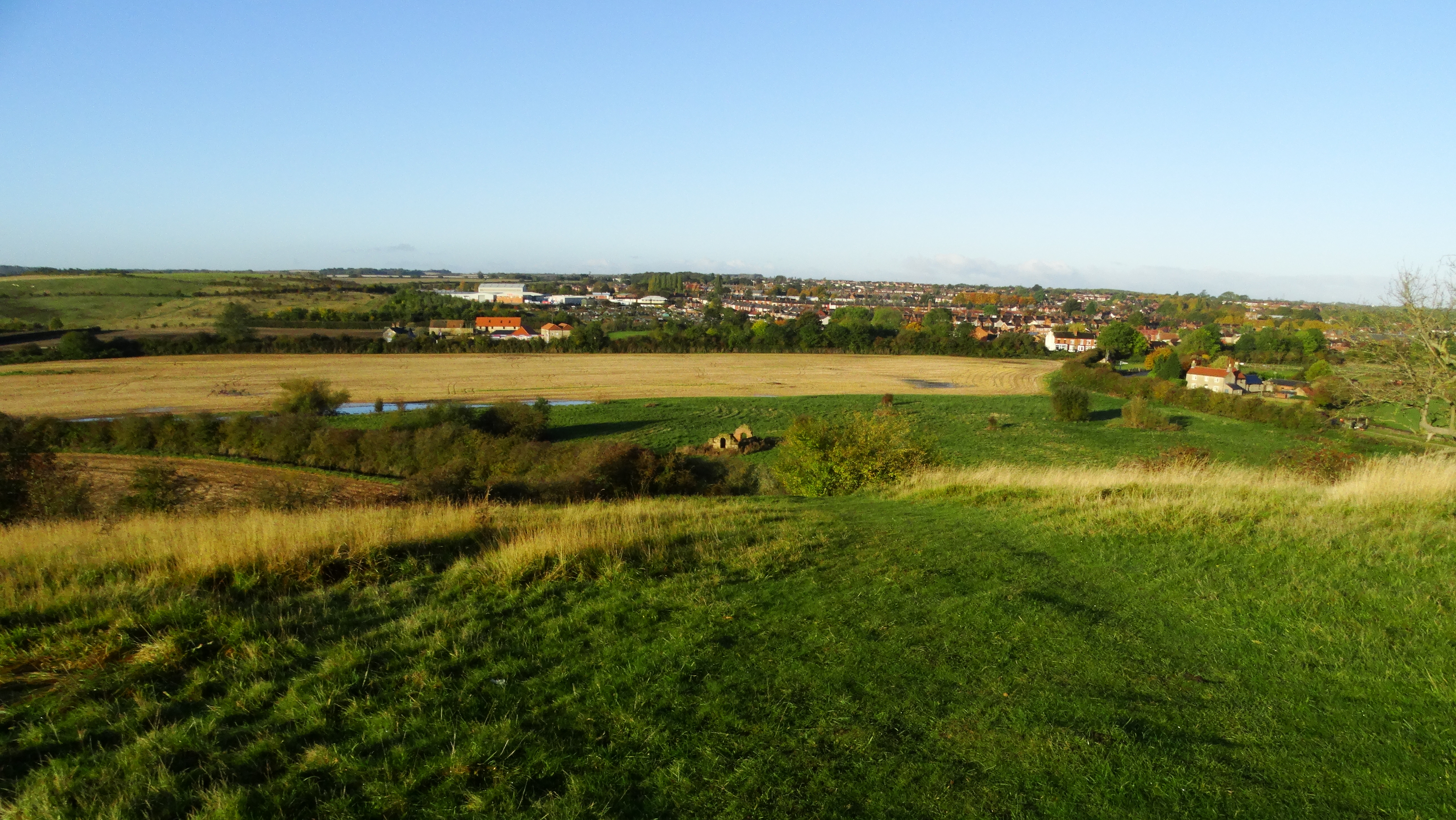
- A view towards Creswell

- Location within Derbyshire
- District: Bolsover
- Shire county: Derbyshire
- Region: East Midlands
- Country: England
- Sovereign state: United Kingdom
- Post town: WORKSOP
- Postcode district: S80
- Dialling code: 01909
- Police: Derbyshire
- Fire: Derbyshire
- Ambulance: East Midlands
- UK Parliament: Bolsover

Elmton with Creswell is a civil parish in the Bolsover district in Derbyshire, England. It covers the villages of Elmton, Creswell and Creswell Model Village. According to Census data in 2001, Elmton with Creswell parish had a population of 4,755, and in 2011 had a population of 5,550. The town lies on the border with Nottinghamshire.

In 1870–72, John Marius Wilson's Imperial Gazetteer of England and Wales described Elmton like this:

ELMTON-WITH-CRESSWELL, a parish in the district of Worksop, and county of Derby; on the NE verge of the county, 5 miles E by S of Staveley r. station, and 8 ENE of Chesterfield. Post town, Clown, under Chesterfield. Acres, 2,970. Real property, £4,421. Pop., 469. Houses, 91. The property is divided among a few. Limestone is found. The living is a vicarage in the diocese of Lichfield. Value, £120. Patron, the Duke of Portland. The church is good. Buxton, the calculating day-labourer, was a native.

== History ==
The parish now known as Elmton with Cresswell began as a medieval settlement. Elmton being recorded in the Domesday Book commissioned by William the Conqueror, but if Creswell existed then it would have been a small outlying hamlet or farm. Elmton didn't grow much in fact hasn't done so over the past 150 years, but Creswell might have become a small hamlet in the Creswell valley consisting of yeoman farmers. In 1722 an Estate Map shows what this post medieval settlement may have looked like with buildings spread along the valley and a nucleus of buildings at the southern end of the village around an open space called Creswell Green, part of which is now known as Fox Green. Further development of Creswell took place in the 18th century in response to the construction of a turnpike road (today A616) along the valley linking Chesterfield and Mansfield. In 1854 the Duke of Portland acquired the Rodes estate in Elmton and Creswell resulting in a significant development of Creswell Village. Over the next 40 years comprehensive improvements to the estate followed with further development of the enclosed landscape, new farm houses, improvements of Elmton Church and at Creswell a school and church. By 1984 Creswell had grown into a hamlet of 30 - 40 houses. The Midland Railway was constructed west of the hamlet in 1975 and the Beighton branch of the Lancashire, Derby and East Coast Railway was constructed a little further west in 1886/97. The overall effects of these changes was to bring about a profound change in the relative importance of the two settlements of Elmton and Creswell between 1841 and 1881. The population of Elmton remained largely static at just over 200, whilst that of Creswell grew from 222 to 300. Over the next two decades it was to rise to over 2000. Between 1894 and 1900 North Eastern Derbyshire was transformed by the Coal Industry and associated increase in population and housing. The Bolsover Colliery Company was formed in 1894 and trial sinking in Crewsell began in the September of the same year. A good seam was found and coal turning commenced in 1897. Construction of the Model Village in Creswell began in 1896 on land purchased from the Duke of Portland and the Village was built to provide cottages for the colliery workforce. Covering land to an extent of approx. 10 acres, the Model Village consists of 250 two storied houses built in the form of a double octagon (an inner and outer circle). After completion of the Model Village, Creswell began to grow.

Other historic buildings of note include Creswell Drill Hall, built by Bolsover Colliery Company in 1903–04 to provide recreational facilities for the Creswell Boys Brigade. During World War 1 the building was converted to a Military Hospital, after which it retained its name Drill Hall but served the community as a social centre until 1976 when it was taken over by the Parish Council and took on its new name Creswell Social Centre. The heritage significance of the village core is greatly enhanced by the fact that the buildings are of a high standard design and construction, reflecting the concerns of the Bolsover Company and the patronage of Duke of Portland - the schools, churches, Model Village, Miners Welfare, Social Centre, the original shop fronts 12-16 18-20 28-30 Elmton Road (circa 1907) Both Village Greens - Elmton and Creswell Fox Green are now registered Village Greens. The population of the Parish has seen prolific growth from its 18th-century total of 500, to 2,000 in 1900, 6,450 in 1971. When the Creswell Colliery closed in 1991 the population dropped 4,820. With new housing at Elmfields and Markland, also the restoration of the Model Village the population has increased to over 5,000.

The parish was formed on 1 April 2014 form "Elmton" and part of Whitwell. However the pre 2014 parish had also sometimes been called "Elmton with Creswell".

== Economy and industry ==
During 1899–1947 a large proportion of the population was employed by the Bolsover Colliery Company, which at its peak was part of the FT 30 index of leading companies on the London Stock Exchange during that time. In 1831, 70 out of the 86 males above the age of 20 living in Elmton worked in agriculture, be it mining or farming

== Housing ==
There are 2,384 households in the Elmton and Creswell area according to 2011 Census data. According to Neighbourhood Statistics on unshared and shared properties in Elmton-with-Creswell, out of the 2,511 dwellings 100% of them are unshared dwellings

Out of the 2,834 households, 655 of those are one person households which is 27.47% of the households in the area There are 10 Listed building within the Elmton area, all with grade two listing, these include, Barn to South of Grange Farmhouse, Church of St Mary Magdalen, Church of St Peter, Creswell Church of England Infants School, Creswell Junior School, Elmton Park Farmhouse, Elmtree Farmhouse, Former Creswell Church of England Secondary School, Grange Farmhouse and the War Memorial on Elmton Road.

== Geography ==
The closest main towns to Elmton with Creswell are Mansfield and Chesterfield as well as Bolsover, Clowne, Shirebrook, Worksop, Sutton-in-Ashfield, Tuxford, Doncaster and Newark-on-Trent. As well as the cities of Sheffield, Nottingham, Manchester and Lincoln.

== Freedom of the Parish ==
The following people and military units have received the Freedom of the Parish of Elmton with Creswell.

=== Individuals ===
- Captain John Perrin USAAF: 21 August 2014. (Awarded Posthumously)

== See also ==
- Listed buildings in Elmton with Creswell
