= Chiswell (surname) =

Chiswell is a surname. Notable people with the surname include:

- David Chiswell (1954–2024), British businessman
- Gordon Albert Chiswell (1922–1942), Australian lance sergeant who was killed in the Ration Truck massacre
- James Chiswell (born 1964), British Army general
- Peter Chiswell (bishop) (1934–2013), Australian Anglican bishop
- Richard Chiswell (1673–1751), English merchant and politician
- Trench Chiswell (died 1797), English antiquary and politician

== See also ==
- Criswell (disambiguation)
