= Creswell, Pennsylvania =

Unincorporated community in Pennsylvania, US

Coordinates: 39°57′43″N 76°26′04″W

Creswell is an unincorporated community in Lancaster County, Pennsylvania, United States.
