= Cathy Creswell =

British psychologist and academic researcher

- Born: Catharine Sarah Creswell
- Education: University of Oxford, University College London (BA (Ox) Hons, PhD)
- Scientific career
- Fields: Psychology; Mental health Children and young people
- Workplaces: University of Reading; University of Oxford
- Thesis: The development of anxious cognitions in children (2004)
- Website: www.psy.ox.ac.uk/team/catharine-creswell

Catharine Sarah Creswell is a British psychologist and Professor of Developmental Clinical Psychology at the University of Oxford. She specialises in anxiety disorders in children and young people.

== Education ==
Creswell was educated at University of Oxford, where she earned her Bachelor of Arts (BA) degree. She later qualified as a Clinical Psychologist at University College London followed by a PhD in 2004.

== Research and career ==
Creswell joined the University of Reading as a research fellow in 2003, where she was later promoted to a National Institute for Health Research (NIHR) Research Professorship. At the University of Reading she led the Anxiety and Depression in Children and Young People clinic (AnDY).

Creswell studies why some children develop anxiety disorders. Anxiety disorders often emerge before the age of 12 and develop in preadolescence. and although 6.5% of children suffer from anxiety disorders, only 2% of those who meet the diagnostic criteria for anxiety disorder seek any effective treatment. In fact, only around 40% of families of children with children seek any type of help.

She has studied how interactions between children and their parents can maintain or break vicious cycles associated with child anxiety. As part of this work, Creswell showed that children of anxious parents are more likely to become anxious, but that this likely reflects a complex interaction of child, parent, and other characteristics For example, she showed that anxious children were more aware of signals from their parents; and that non-anxious children were less likely to be influenced by what their parents were doing.

As a result of this work, she developed a therapist-guided, parent-led cognitive behavioral therapy (CBT) for the management of child anxiety disorders, which is a now available on the National Health Service (NHS). She demonstrated that only 5 hours of therapist-supported training was enough to support parents in helping their children tackle anxiety.

She joined the University of Oxford in 2019. At Oxford, Creswell leads the Emerging Minds Mental Health Network. Emerging Minds is a network that looks to reduce the number of children who experience mental health challenges. Creswell is a member of the scientific advisory group of Evidence to Impact, a not-for-profit organisation that looks to improve public health.

During the COVID-19 pandemic, Creswell co-led the Co-SPACE (COVID-19 Supporting Parents, Adolescents and Children during Epidemics). Co-SPACE looks to understand how families cope with coronavirus disease and the impact of the pandemic on children and young people's mental health. In May 2020, the first round of results from the Co-SPACE study, showing that work and their children's wellbeing was the most frequent source of stress for parents. Her study revealed that only 1 in 5 families who had previously received care continued to do so throughout the lockdown. In particular, the highest levels of stress were found amongst parents of children with special educational needs (SEN).

Creswell was elected a Fellow of the Academy of Medical Sciences in 2022.

== Selected publications ==
Creswell's publications include:

- Evidence from turner's syndrome of an imprinted x-linked locus affecting cognitive function
- Murray, Lynne; Cooper, Peter; Creswell, Cathy; Schofield, Elizabeth; Sack, Caroline (2007). "The effects of maternal social phobia on mother–infant interactions and infant social responsiveness" (PDF). Journal of Child Psychology and Psychiatry. 48 (1): 45–52. doi:10.1111/j.1469-7610.2006.01657.x. ISSN 1469-7610. PMID 17244269.
- Creswell, Cathy (23 April 2019). Parent-led CBT for child anxiety : helping parents help their kids. ISBN 978-1-4625-4080-8. OCLC 1083715089.
- Creswell, Cathy (11 April 2019). Helping your child with fears and worries : a self-help guide for parents. Willetts, Lucy,, Cooper, Peter J.,, Waite, Polly, 1972- (Second ed.). London. ISBN 978-1-4721-3861-3. OCLC 1101411122.
