= 2011 Bolsover District Council election =

Local election in Derbyshire, England

Map of the results of the 2011 Bolsover District Council election. Labour in red, independents in light grey, Whitwell Residents Association in grey and Green Party in green.

The 2011 Bolsover District Council election took place on 5 May 2011 to elect members of Bolsover District Council in Derbyshire, England. The whole council was up for election and the Labour Party stayed in overall control of the council.

== Election result ==
Bolsover local election result 2011
Party	Seats	Gains	Losses	Net gain/loss	Seats %	Votes %	Votes	+/−
Labour	31	4	0	+4	83.8	64.5	23,712	+3.7
Independent	4	0	3	-3	10.8	14.4	5,310	-9.1
Whitwell Residents Association	1	0	1	-1	2.7	2.1	778	-3.2
Green	1	1	0	+1	2.7	1.2	453	0.0
Conservative	0	0	0	0	0.0	11.9	4,381	+11.9
BNP	0	0	0	0	0.0	3.1	1,123	+1.1
Barlborough First	0	0	0	0	0.0	1.2	423	-3.3
TUSC	0	0	1	-1	0.0	0.9	346	+0.9
Liberal Democrats	0	0	0	0	0.0	0.7	247	-0.6

== Ward results ==
Barlborough (2 seats)
Party	Candidate	Votes	%	±%
Labour	Eion Watts	690		
Labour	Hilary Gilmour	588		
Barlborough First	John Shaw	423		
Conservative	Klara Jeynes	286		
Turnout		1,987	46.0	
Labour hold		Swing		
Labour hold		Swing		

Blackwell (2 seats)
Party	Candidate	Votes	%	±%
Labour	Alan Tomlinson	777		
Labour	Clare Munks	638		
Independent	Dexter Bullock	435		
Conservative	Suzanne Harkins	278		
Liberal Democrats	Ian Cox	247		
Independent	Paula Wilkinson	226		
Independent	Leonard Walker	104		
Turnout		2,705	44.5	
Labour hold		Swing		
Labour gain from Independent		Swing		

Bolsover North West (2 seats)
Party	Candidate	Votes	%	±%
Labour	Paul Cooper	561		
Labour	Thomas Rodda	528		
Conservative	Ann Marshall	277		
Turnout		1,366	31.6	
Labour hold		Swing		
Labour hold		Swing		

Bolsover South (2 seats)
Party	Candidate	Votes	%	±%
Labour	Jennie Bennett	787		
Labour	James Hall	611		
Conservative	Nicholas Gray-Cowley	351		
Turnout		1,749	59.1	
Labour hold		Swing		
Labour hold		Swing		

Bolsover West (2 seats)
Party	Candidate	Votes	%	±%
Labour	Keith Bowman	661		
Labour	Rosemary Bowler	628		
Conservative	Maxine Hunt	222		
TUSC	Jonathan Dale	174		
Turnout		1,685	36.9	
Labour hold		Swing		
Labour hold		Swing		

Clowne North (2 seats)
Party	Candidate	Votes	%	±%
Labour	Brian Hendry	611		
Labour	Terence Connerton	544		
Independent	Paul Hendry	262		
Conservative	Malcolm Rowley	217		
Turnout		1,634	33.1	
Labour gain from Independent		Swing		
Labour hold		Swing		

Clowne South (2 seats)
Party	Candidate	Votes	%	±%
Labour	James Smith	655		
Labour	Karl Reid	600		
Independent	Allan Bailey	454		
Conservative	Natasha Gray-Cowley	250		
Turnout		1,959	40.8	
Labour hold		Swing		
Labour gain from Independent		Swing		

Elmton with Creswell (3 seats)
Party	Candidate	Votes	%	±%
Labour	Duncan McGregor	1,211		
Labour	Rita Turner	1,059		
Independent	James Clifton	972		
Labour	Paul Colbert	921		
Conservative	Derek Stiff	258		
Turnout		4,421	41.4	
Labour hold		Swing		
Labour hold		Swing		
Independent hold		Swing		

Pinxton (2 seats)
Party	Candidate	Votes	%	±%
Labour	Mary Dooley	658		
Labour	Dennis Kelly	608		
Independent	John Meredith	330		
Independent	Cherry Drake-Brockman	210		
Conservative	Kristie Matthewman-Know	178		
Turnout		1,984	33.7	
Labour hold		Swing		
Labour hold		Swing		

Pleasley (2 seats)
Party	Candidate	Votes	%	±%
Labour	Pauline Bowmer	828		
Labour	Ann Syrett	615		
Conservative	Stephen Matthewman-Know	401		
Turnout		1,844	42.6	
Labour hold		Swing		
Labour hold		Swing		

Scarcliffe (2 seats)
Party	Candidate	Votes	%	±%
Labour	Jennifer Wilson	803		
Labour	Malcolm Crane	711		
Conservative	Nicholas Sternberg	297		
BNP	Martin Radford	237		
BNP	Nigel Poynton	185		
Turnout		2,233	42.2	
Labour hold		Swing		
Labour hold		Swing		

Shirebrook East
Party	Candidate	Votes	%	±%
Labour	Brian Murray-Carr	332	72.0	
BNP	Gary Widdowson	75	16.3	
Conservative	Mark McKeown	54	11.7	
Majority		257	55.7	
Turnout		461	40.8	
Labour hold		Swing		

Shirebrook Langwith
Party	Candidate	Votes	%	±%
Labour	Kenneth Walker	571	80.6	
BNP	Lesley Redding	137	19.4	
Majority		434	61.3	
Turnout		708	42.3	
Labour hold		Swing		

Shirebrook North West
Party	Candidate	Votes	%	±%
Labour	Stephen Fritchley	330	54.2	+7.0
TUSC	Raymond Holmes	172	28.2	−24.6
BNP	Paul Harford	107	17.6	+17.6
Majority		158	25.9	
Turnout		609	30.0	
Labour gain from TUSC		Swing		

Shirebrook South East
Party	Candidate	Votes	%	±%
Labour	Andrew Anderson	402	65.5	
BNP	Nigel Shipman	132	21.5	
Conservative	Aidan Press	80	13.0	
Majority		270	44.0	
Turnout		614	40.2	
Labour hold		Swing		

Shirebrook South West
Party	Candidate	Votes	%	±%
Independent	Alan Waring	403	52.1	+2.0
Labour	Hazel Ward	249	32.2	−17.7
BNP	Alan Brown	74	9.6	+9.6
Conservative	Frederick Newholme	47	6.1	+6.1
Majority		154	19.9	+19.8
Turnout		773	40.3	
Independent hold		Swing		

South Normanton East (2 seats)
Party	Candidate	Votes	%	±%
Labour	Terry Cook	647		
Labour	John Phelan	597		
Conservative	Claire Gratton	248		
Conservative	Michael Holmes	228		
BNP	Brian Edwards	176		
Turnout		1,896	32.4	
Labour hold		Swing		
Labour hold		Swing		

South Normanton West (3 seats)
Party	Candidate	Votes	%	±%
Labour	Raymond Brooks	906		
Labour	Susan Wallis	824		
Labour	Graham Parkin	765		
Conservative	Robert Sainsbury	709		
Turnout		3,204	35.2	
Labour hold		Swing		
Labour hold		Swing		
Labour hold		Swing		

Tibshelf (2 seats)
Party	Candidate	Votes	%	±%
Independent	Raymond Heffer	784		
Independent	Deborah Watson	752		
Labour	Kathryn Salt	620		
Labour	Anthony Trafford	451		
Turnout		2,607	40.7	
Independent hold		Swing		
Independent hold		Swing		

Whitwell (2 seats)
Party	Candidate	Votes	%	±%
Green	Duncan Kerr	453		
Whitwell Residents Association	George Webster	452		
Labour	Thomas Munro	383		
Independent	Sandra Frow	378		
Labour	Jeanne Raspin	342		
Whitwell Residents Association	Vivienne Mills	326		
Turnout		2,334	41.4	
Green gain from Residents		Swing		
Residents hold		Swing		

== By-elections between 2011 and 2015 ==
=== Shirebrook South West ===
A by-election was held in Shirebrook South West on 25 August 2011 after the death of the independent councillor Alan Waring. The seat was gained for the Labour Party by Sandra Peake with a majority of 97 votes over the Green Party.

Shirebrook South West by-election 25 August 2011
Party	Candidate	Votes	%	±%
Labour	Sandra Peake	200	47.8	+15.6
Green	Ian Musgrove	103	24.6	+24.6
Conservative	Frederick Newholme	72	17.2	+11.1
BNP	David Key	43	10.3	+0.7
Majority		97	23.2	
Turnout		418		
Labour gain from Independent		Swing		

=== Whitwell ===
Whitwell by-election 23 May 2013
Party	Candidate	Votes	%	±%
Whitwell Residents Association	Vivienne Mills	347	57.5	
Labour	Frank Raspin	256	42.5	
Majority		91	15.1	
Turnout		603		
Residents gain from Green		Swing		

=== South Normanton East ===
A by-election was held in South Normanton East on 14 August 2014 after the death of Labour councillor Terry Cook. The seat was held for Labour by Tracey Cannon with a majority of 173 votes over the Conservatives.

South Normanton East by-election 14 August 2014
Party	Candidate	Votes	%	±%
Labour	Tracey Cannon	293	70.9	+10.5
Conservative	Robert Sainsbury	120	29.1	+5.9
Majority		173	41.9	
Turnout		413	12.5	−19.9
Labour hold		Swing		

=== Bolsover North West ===
A by-election was held in Bolsover North West on 8 January 2015 after the death of Labour councillor Thomas Rodda. The seat was held for Labour by Susan Statter with a majority of 21 votes over the UK Independence Party.

Bolsover North West by-election 8 January 2015
Party	Candidate	Votes	%	±%
Labour	Susan Statter	174	45.0	−22.0
UKIP	John Bagshaw	153	39.5	+39.5
Conservative	Maxine Hunt	60	15.5	−17.6
Majority		21	5.4	
Turnout		387	13.4	−18.2
Labour hold		Swing		
