= Smyrna, Jefferson County, Indiana =

Unincorporated community in Indiana, U.S.

Coordinates: 38°46′55″N 85°28′51″W

Smyrna is an unincorporated community in Jefferson County, Indiana, in the United States. It is also called Creswell.

A post office called Creswell operated from 1869 until 1902.
