= Revolutionary Socialist Alternative =

Revolutionary Socialist Alternative Alternativa Socialista Revolucionaria
- Headquarters: Cochabamba, Bolivia
- Newspaper: La Voz Obrera (Workers' Voice)
- Ideology: Trotskyism; Socialism; Marxism
- Political position: Far-left
- International affiliation: Committee for a Workers' International
- Colours: Red

Website
- alternativasocialistarevolucionaria.blogspot.com

Revolutionary Socialist Alternative (Spanish: Alternativa Socialista Revolucionaria) was a Trotskyist political party in Bolivia. It was affiliated to the Committee for a Workers' International (CWI). It produced the newspaper La Voz Obrera (Workers' Voice).

It was based in Cochabamba, providing an information board in the central plaza and had organised the People’s Plaza Defense Committee to defend social movements in the city against attacks by right-wing thugs. Members have also played a role in supporting the hunger strike of the Sindicato Mixto de Trabajadores Petroleros Gualberto Villarroel union leaders demanding back their jobs.

On April 12 2015 the members of the ASR decided to break with the CIT and to leave the ASR.
