= Creswell High School =

Creswell High School may refer to:

- Creswell High School (Oregon), Creswell, Oregon
- Creswell High School (North Carolina), Creswell, North Carolina
