= Elmton =

Village in Derbyshire, England

Coordinates: 53.255°N 1.247°W

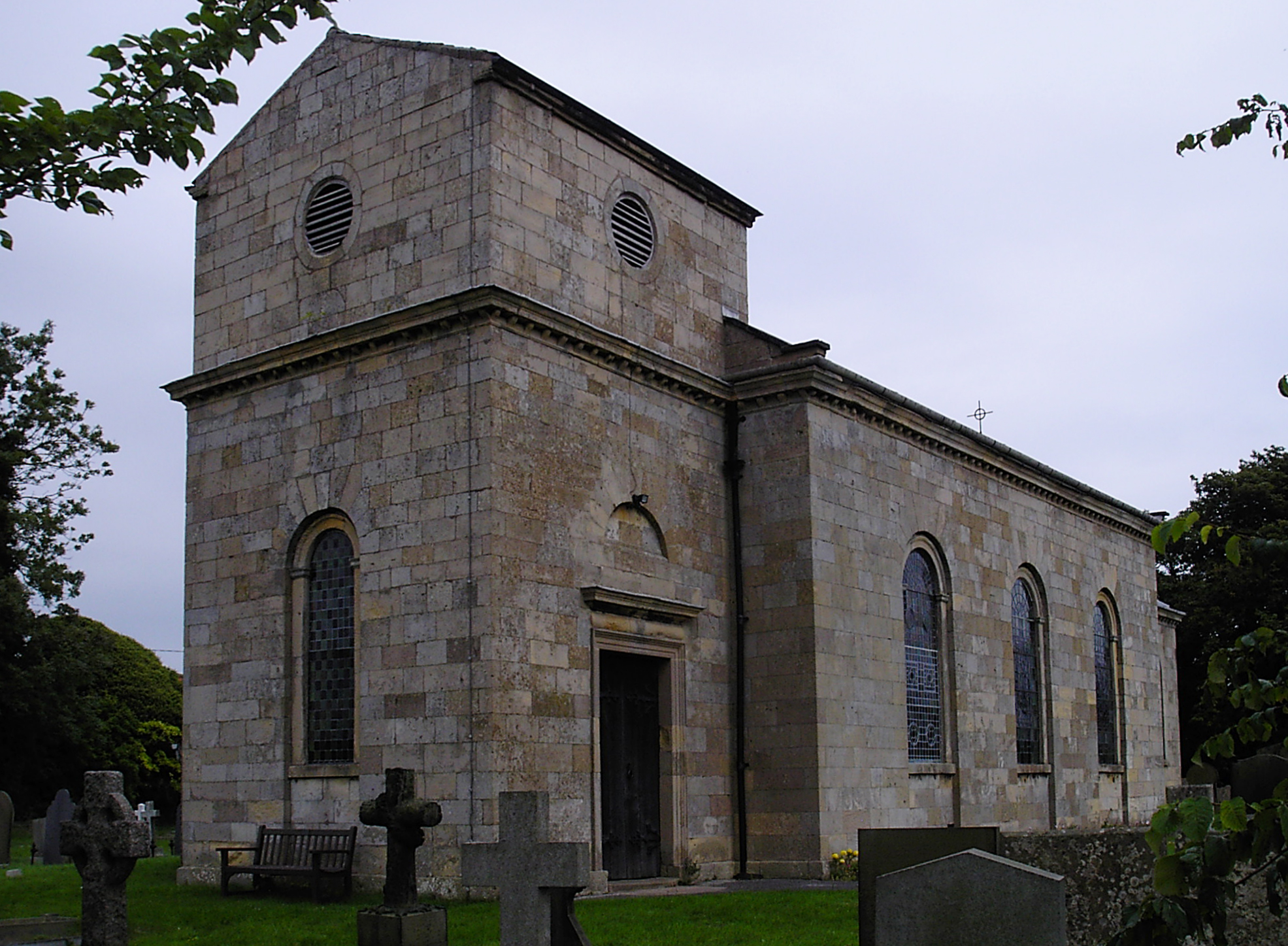
- Elmton Church

- Location within Derbyshire
- Area: 11.973 km^{2} (4.623 sq mi)
- Population: 5,926 (2021census)
  - Density: 495/km^{2} (1,280/sq mi)
- OS grid reference: SK503733
- Civil parish: Elmton with Creswell
- District: Bolsover
- Shire county: Derbyshire
- Region: East Midlands
- Country: England
- Sovereign state: United Kingdom
- Post town: WORKSOP
- Postcode district: S80
- Police: Derbyshire
- Fire: Derbyshire
- Ambulance: East Midlands

Elmton is a linear village and former civil parish, now in the parish of Elmton with Creswell in the Bolsover district of Derbyshire, England, approximately equidistant from Bolsover Castle and Creswell Crags. In 2011 the parish had a population of 5550. On 1 April 2014 the parish was abolished to form "Elmton with Creswell". However the pre 2014 parish had also sometimes been called "Elmton with Creswell".

== History ==
There is evidence of human habitation in the area from the Ice Age, an Iron Age fort and possibly a Roman camp. A Roman ring found in Elmton is on display in Chesterfield Museum and Art Gallery. The village was named Helmetune in Anglo Saxon times after the large number of elm trees that were once a major feature. By the time of the Domesday Survey in 1086 the village was a manor belonging to Walter D'Aincourt. The Victoria County History has published a detailed online account of the history of Elmton from ancient times.

In 1707, Jedediah Buxton, the legendary mental calculator, was born here (a blue plaque was erected in his honour in 2011 after a public poll).

Much of the village was rebuilt in the middle of the 19th century when the local estate changed ownership: the 1886/7 Ordnance Survey map shows the village soon after this period. Although there has been some redevelopment and infilling since WW2, the village remains similar in size and form to this day. Once belonging to the Dukes of Portland of Welbeck Abbey, the surrounding tenant farms today form part of the estates of Chatsworth House.

Village wells are decorated with flowers in the Derbyshire well dressing tradition in late June / early July each year. Well dressings coincide with the National Gardens Scheme (NGS) Open Gardens with several village gardens open to the public raising money for national nursing charities such as Macmillan. There is also an exhibition and cream teas are served in the Schoolroom.

Elmton has been voted Best Small Village in the East Midlands in Bloom competition in 2010, 2011, 2015, 2016, 2017, 2018 & 2019 with a Judges Award in 2011 for measures to protect the Bee Orchid. The village was a finalist in the RHS Britain in Bloom competition in 2018. With just 64 residents, Elmton was the smallest community in the competition; it won a silver gilt award and came 5th= out of 10 finalists in the Village category. In 2019, the village won a gold award in the RHS East Midlands in Bloom competition.

The Elm Tree Inn, Elmton was voted the Best Traditional Pub in Derbyshire at the Derbyshire Food and Drinks Awards 2011.

The Elmton Community Association has published an online village trail.

== Natural history ==
The church and most of the older properties are built out of the local magnesian limestone. The limestone provides a habitat with rare flora and fauna, such as the Bee Orchid. The village is also close to the limestone valleys and gorges of Hollinhill and Markland Grips, a nature reserve and Site of Special Scientific Interest managed by Derbyshire Wildlife Trust.

The elm trees that gave the village its name fell victim to Dutch Elm Disease and were felled in the 1970s. On 17 November 2012, residents planted a sapling on the village green from an elm that withstood the disease in honour of the Queen's Diamond Jubilee.

== Church ==
The Anglican parish church is dedicated to St Peter. It was rebuilt in 1773; it is a simple Georgian building with an unfinished tower and a pulpit with a sounding board. It contains an organ made by Charles Brindley of Sheffield in 1865, which was restored by Martin Goetze and Dominic Gwynn in 2005. The church contains a drawing of Jedediah Buxton made by a Miss Maria Hartley in 1764.

== See also ==
- Listed buildings in Elmton with Creswell
