= Robert W. Criswell =

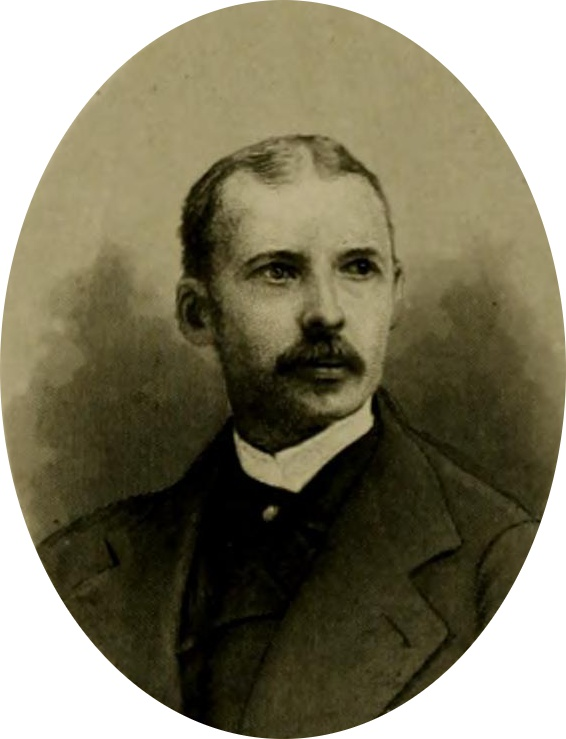
- Born: 1850; Clarion County, Pennsylvania
- Died: August 3, 1905 (aged 54–55); New York City
- Education: Moores Hill College
- Occupations: Journalist, editor, humorist
- Writing career
- Pen name: Grandfather Lickshingle

Robert Wesley Criswell (1850 – August 3, 1905) was an American humorist, journalist, and newspaper editor. He was known for his popular essays and books under the pen name Grandfather Lickshingle. After working at newspapers in Ohio, Indiana, and Pennsylvania, he joined the New York World, and later became editor of the New Yorker newspaper. In 1905 he was arrested for criminal libel after publishing an article allegedly impugning Alice Roosevelt, daughter of U.S. President Theodore Roosevelt. While awaiting trial for libel, and also under suspicion of defrauding subscribers, he was struck by a New York City subway train in an apparent suicide.

== Early life and career ==
Robert Wesley Criswell was born in Clarion County, Pennsylvania, in 1850. (Note: Two contemporary biographies written during Criswell's life state Criswell's birthplace as Clarion County, while a 2013 book states Criswell was born and raised in Aurora, Indiana.) His father, also named Robert Criswell, was a prominent man in Clarion County, who afterward found success in the oil business of Venango County. The younger Robert attended the Chickering Institute in Cincinnati (Note: The Chickering Classical and Scientific Institute was a "select school for boys" that operated in Cincinnati from 1855 to 1866.) and Moores Hill College, Indiana, and his brother David became a noted oil producer.

Criswell's first newspaper work was writing occasional sketches for the Cincinnati Commercial. Later he was employed as local editor of the Independent, published at East Brady, Pennsylvania. From East Brady he went to Cincinnati and worked a year for The Cincinnati Enquirer writing political letters from Indiana and reporting on the Indiana legislature. While at Indianapolis he accepted an offer to come to Oil City, Pennsylvania and edit the Oil City Derrick, assuming editorship in 1877, also establishing the publishing firm Boyle & Criswell which published the Derrick until 1889. A feature of his work on the Derrick was a humor department, which was quoted widely internationally. He again returned to Cincinnati, to take a position on the staff of the Enquirer, afterward succeeding to the managing editorship of that paper, which position he held for five years. Criswell was editor of the Petroleum World at Titusville, and his last newspaper connection in the oil country was as one of the proprietors of the Derrick under the firm name of Boyle & Criswell. He published two books of humor: The New Shakspeare, and Grandfather Lickshingle and Other Sketches.

In 1878, he married Alice McCreary, a niece of former Kentucky Governor James B. McCreary.

== New York career and death ==
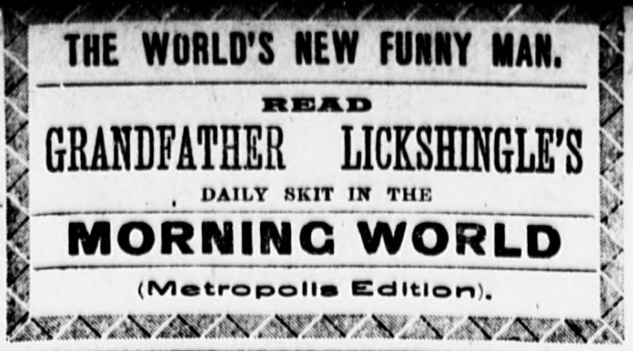
1890 promotion for "Grandfather Lickshingle" columns

He later worked for the New York Daily Graphic and by 1890, Criswell had joined the staff of the New York World. In 1904, Criswell became editor of The New Yorker, (Note: Not to be confused with modern-day New Yorker, which was founded in 1925 and is still in print.) a weekly newspaper established 3 years earlier.

On June 21, 1905, Criswell published an article titled "An Insult to Alice Roosevelt" which alleged President Roosevelt's daughter Alice was being utilized by Ohio congressman Nicholas Longworth to advance his career, and that Longworth introduced Roosevelt to unsavory persons, including racetrack bookmakers and Kentucky representative Joseph L. Rhinock, who had reportedly been indicted for stealing $50 from a man. A criminal libel suit was filed by Rhinock against Criswell and The New Yorker, and Criswell was arrested on July 11. Criswell claimed that the article was written by a trusted Cincinnati correspondent who had viewed Rhinock's indictment. Criswell was released on $1,000 bail, with a trial set for September.

On August 3, 1905, Criswell, "evidently under stress of great excitement", ran down the steps of the 72nd Street subway station, ran alongside a train, jumped in front of the cars, and was killed instantly. After his death, it was revealed Criswell and New Yorker publisher Robert A. Irving were suspected of engaging in fraud: Assistant District Attorney Paul Krotel stated Criswell and Irving had collected $6,500 from subscribers for a book to be called America's Foremost Families, but upon review of accounting, no money had been spent on production, and no evidence was presented that any part of the book had been written. Krotel said Criswell "was very nervous and scared the last time he was here, and I am not greatly surprised to hear of his death".

After Criswell's death, Irving was jailed for the same libel suit. Criswell's death was formally declared a suicide by the coroner after two witnesses testified that Criswell flung himself in front of an approaching train and then deliberately laid his head and hands on the rail. The libel suit resumed in October. The New Yorker was defunct by January, 1906, when all that remained "above ground or out of jail" was a desk and chair. Criswell's body was said to be taken to Aurora, Indiana, for burial.

== Books ==
- The New Shakspeare and Other Travesties. New York: American News Company. 1882.
- Grandfather Lickshingle and Other Sketches. J. W. Lovell. 1883.
