= Emily Grace Creswell =

British artist

- Born: 1 June 1889; Ravenstone, Leicestershire, England
- Died: 1974 (aged 84–85)
- Education: University College, Reading; Leicester College of Art
- Known for: Portrait painting, miniatures

Emily Grace Creswell (born 1 June 1889 –1974) was a British artist, known for painting portraits and miniatures.

== Biography ==
Creswell was born at Ravenstone in Leicestershire and attended University College, Reading before studying at a succession of art schools in Leicester, Harrogate and Leamington Spa. She also took lessons from the miniature painter Arthur Lindsay in London. Creswell exhibited with the Royal Birmingham Society of Artists, the Royal Miniature Society, the Royal Institute of Painters in Water Colours, the Society of Women Artists and elsewhere in England. She lived for most of her life in Leamington Spa and later at Harrogate.
