= 2015 Bolsover District Council election =

2015 UK local government election

Map of the results of the 2015 Bolsover District Council election. Labour in red and independents in light grey.

The 2015 Bolsover District Council election took place on 7 May 2015 to elect members of Bolsover District Council in Derbyshire, England. The whole council was up for election and the Labour Party stayed in overall control of the council.

== Election result ==
Labour remained in control of the council with 32 councillors, while five independents were also elected. The seats in Bolsover South, Pleasely and Shirebrook South West were taken by Labour candidates without opposition.

Bolsover local election result 2015
Party	Seats	Gains	Losses	Net gain/loss	Seats %	Votes %	Votes	+/−
Labour	32	2	2	0	86.5	65.9	28,971	+1.4
Independent	5	2	0	+2	13.5	21.2	9,342	+6.8
Conservative	0	0	0	0	0.0	4.1	1,791	-7.8
UKIP	0	0	0	0	0.0	3.5	1,538	+3.5
TUSC	0	0	0	0	0.0	3.0	1,341	+2.1
Whitwell Residents Association	0	0	2	-2	0.0	2.2	987	+0.1

== Ward results ==
Barlborough (2 seats)
Party	Candidate	Votes	%	±%
Labour	Hilary Gilmour	919		
Labour	Brian Watson	840		
Conservative	Maxine Hunt	688		
Turnout		2,447	64.4	+18.4
Labour hold		Swing		
Labour hold		Swing		

Blackwell (2 seats)
Party	Candidate	Votes	%	±%
Labour	Clive Moesby	1,277		
Independent	Dexter Bullock	1,011		
Labour	Clare Munks	951		
Turnout		3,239	63.7	+19.2
Labour hold		Swing		
Independent gain from Labour		Swing		

Bolsover North West (2 seats)
Party	Candidate	Votes	%	±%
Labour	Christopher Cooper	1,008		
Labour	Sue Statter	968		
TUSC	Elaine Evans	359		
Turnout		2,335	55.0	+23.4
Labour hold		Swing		
Labour hold		Swing		

Bolsover South (2 seats)
Party	Candidate	Votes	%	±%
Labour	Toni Bennett	unopposed		
Labour	James Hall	unopposed		
Labour hold		Swing		
Labour hold		Swing		

Bolsover West (2 seats)
Party	Candidate	Votes	%	±%
Labour	Rose Bowler	821		
Labour	Mark Dixey	756		
UKIP	John Bagshaw	653		
TUSC	Jon Dale	217		
Turnout		2,447	59.4	+22.5
Labour hold		Swing		
Labour hold		Swing		

Clowne North (2 seats)
Party	Candidate	Votes	%	±%
Labour	Terry Connerton	1,037		
Labour	Gwyneth Buxton	973		
Conservative	David Jackson	551		
Turnout		2,561	55.8	+22.7
Labour hold		Swing		
Labour hold		Swing		

Clowne South (2 seats)
Party	Candidate	Votes	%	±%
Labour	Karl Reid	841		
Labour	Jim Smith	829		
Independent	Allan Bailey	639		
Conservative	Radley Cunliffe	458		
Turnout		2,767	62.9	+22.1
Labour hold		Swing		
Labour hold		Swing		

Elmton-with-Creswell (3 seats)
Party	Candidate	Votes	%	±%
Independent	Jim Clifton	1,337		
Labour	Duncan McGregor	1,328		
Labour	Rita Turner	1,253		
Labour	Paul Colbert	1,043		
Turnout		4,961	55.8	+14.4
Independent hold		Swing		
Labour hold		Swing		
Labour hold		Swing		

Pinxton (2 seats)
Party	Candidate	Votes	%	±%
Labour	Mark Dooley	960		
Labour	Tom Alexander	752		
Independent	John Meredith	601		
Independent	Cherry Drake-Brockman	587		
Turnout		2,900	54.5	+20.8
Labour hold		Swing		
Labour hold		Swing		

Pleasley (2 seats)
Party	Candidate	Votes	%	±%
Labour	Pauline Bowmer	unopposed		
Labour	Ann Syrett	unopposed		
Labour hold		Swing		
Labour hold		Swing		

Scarcliffe (2 seats)
Party	Candidate	Votes	%	±%
Labour	Jen Wilson	1,047		
Labour	Malc Crane	871		
Independent	Suzanne Barnicoat	837		
Turnout		2,755	60.9	+18.7
Labour hold		Swing		
Labour hold		Swing		

Shirebrook East
Party	Candidate	Votes	%	±%
Labour	Brian Murray-Carr	406	65.1	−6.9
UKIP	John Charlesworth	218	34.9	+34.9
Majority		188	30.1	−25.6
Turnout		624	56.2	+15.4
Labour hold		Swing		

Shirebrook Langwith
Party	Candidate	Votes	%	±%
Labour	Kenneth Walker	614	61.8	−18.8
UKIP	Iris Scott	379	38.2	+38.2
Majority		235	23.7	−37.6
Turnout		993	61.7	+19.4
Labour hold		Swing		

Shirebrook North West
Party	Candidate	Votes	%	±%
Labour	Stephen Frithcley	601	73.9	+19.7
TUSC	Dean Eggleston	212	26.1	−2.1
Majority		389	47.8	+21.9
Turnout		813	50.6	+20.6
Labour hold		Swing		

Shirebrook South East
Party	Candidate	Votes	%	±%
Labour	Andrew Anderson	503	56.8	−8.7
UKIP	Valerie Waby	288	32.5	+32.5
Conservative	Mark McKeown	94	10.6	−2.4
Majority		215	24.3	−19.7
Turnout		885	54.8	+14.6
Labour hold		Swing		

Shirebrook South West
Party	Candidate	Votes	%	±%
Labour	Sandra Peake	unopposed		
Labour hold		Swing		

South Normanton East (2 seats)
Party	Candidate	Votes	%	±%
Labour	Tracey Cannon	969		
Independent	Andrew Joesbury	873		
Labour	Graham Parkin	769		
Turnout		2,611	54.3	+21.9
Labour hold		Swing		
Independent gain from Labour		Swing		

South Normanton West (3 seats)
Party	Candidate	Votes	%	±%
Labour	Emma Stevenson	1,360		
Labour	Paul Barnes	1,288		
Labour	Phil Smith	1,108		
TUSC	Brian Loader	553		
Turnout		4,309	55.4	+20.2
Labour hold		Swing		
Labour hold		Swing		
Labour hold		Swing		

Tibshelf (2 seats)
Party	Candidate	Votes	%	±%
Independent	Deborah Watson	1,166		
Independent	Ray Heffer	1,149		
Labour	Kathryn Salt	967		
Labour	Tony Trafford	696		
Turnout		3,978	60.5	+19.8
Independent hold		Swing		
Independent hold		Swing		

Whitwell (2 seats)
Party	Candidate	Votes	%	±%
Labour	Tom Munro	672		
Labour	Malcolm Ritchie	544		
Whitwell Residents Association	George Webster	538		
Independent	Stuart Maiden	476		
Whitwell Residents Association	Viv Mills	449		
Independent	Malcolm Streets	422		
Independent	Pete Roberts	244		
Turnout		3,345	60.1	+18.7
Labour gain from Residents		Swing		
Labour gain from Residents		Swing		

== By-elections between 2015 and 2019 ==
A by-election was held in Bolsover South on 8 October 2015, following the death of Labour councillor James Hall. The seat was won by Labour candidate Pat Cooper.

Bolsover South by-election 8 October 2015
Party	Candidate	Votes	%	±%
Labour	Pat Cooper	232	42.5	N/A
UKIP	John Bagshaw	127	23.3	N/A
Conservative	Juliet Armstrong	109	20.0	N/A
TUSC	Jon Dale	78	14.3	N/A
Majority		105	19.2	
Turnout		546		
Labour hold		Swing		
