= Elijah Cresswell =

Scottish footballer

Personal information
- Full name: Elijah J Cresswell
- Date of birth: 18 July 1889
- Place of birth: Parkhead, Scotland
- Date of death: 4 November 1931 (aged 42)
- Place of death: Shettleston, Scotland
- Position: Forward

Senior career*
Years	Team	Apps	(Gls)
1913–1918	Queen's Park	97	(11)
- * Club domestic league appearances and goals

Elijah J. Cresswell (18 July 1889 – 4 November 1931) was a Scottish amateur footballer who played as a forward in the Scottish League for Queen's Park.

== Personal life ==
Cresswell worked as a claims inspector and as of 1915 was married with two children. In 1915, during the second year of the First World War, he enlisted as a guardsman in the Coldstream Guards.

== Career statistics ==
Appearances and goals by club, season and competition
Club	Season	League			Scottish Cup		Other		Total	
Club	Season	Division	Apps	Goals	Apps	Goals	Apps	Goals	Apps	Goals
Queen's Park	1913–14	Scottish First Division	19	3	5	2	1 (Note: Appearance in Glasgow Merchants Charity Cup)	0	25	5
Queen's Park	1914–15	Scottish First Division	17	2	—		4 (Note: 2 appearances in Glasgow Cup, 1 appearance in Glasgow Merchants Charity Cup, 1 appearance in War Fund Shield)	0	21	2
Queen's Park	1915–16	Scottish First Division	34	4	—		3 (Note: 2 appearances in Glasgow Merchants Charity Cup, 1 appearance in Glasgow Cup)	0	37	4
Queen's Park	1916–17	Scottish First Division	5	0	—		1 (Note: Appearance in Glasgow Cup)	0	6	0
Queen's Park	1917–18	Scottish First Division	22	2	—		0	0	22	2
Career total			97	11	5	2	9	0	111	13
