= Creswell, Derbyshire =

Village in Derbyshire, England

Coordinates: 53.265°N 1.213°W

Creswell
- Village
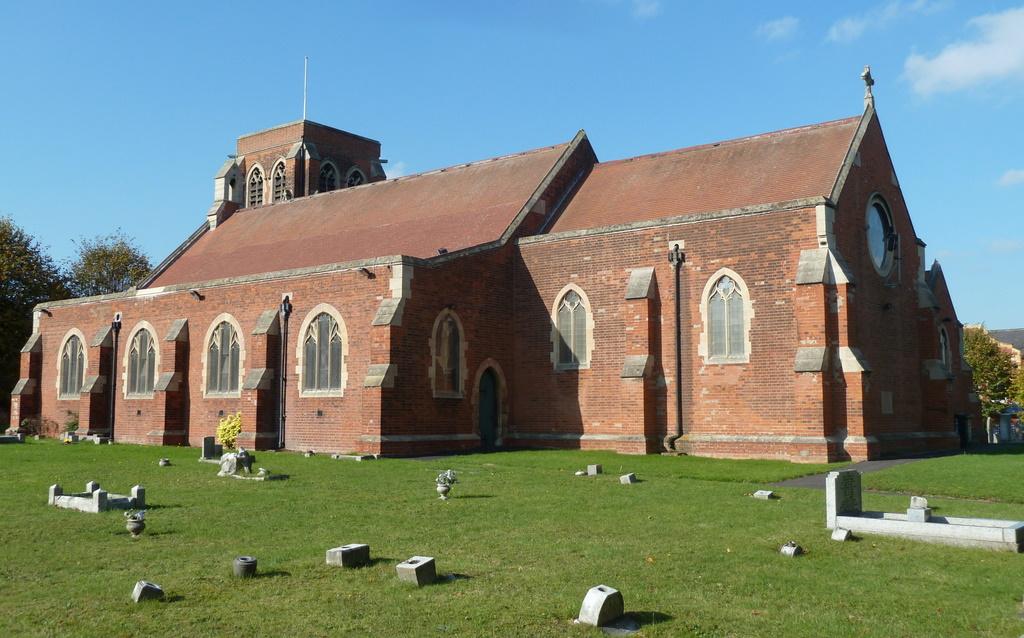
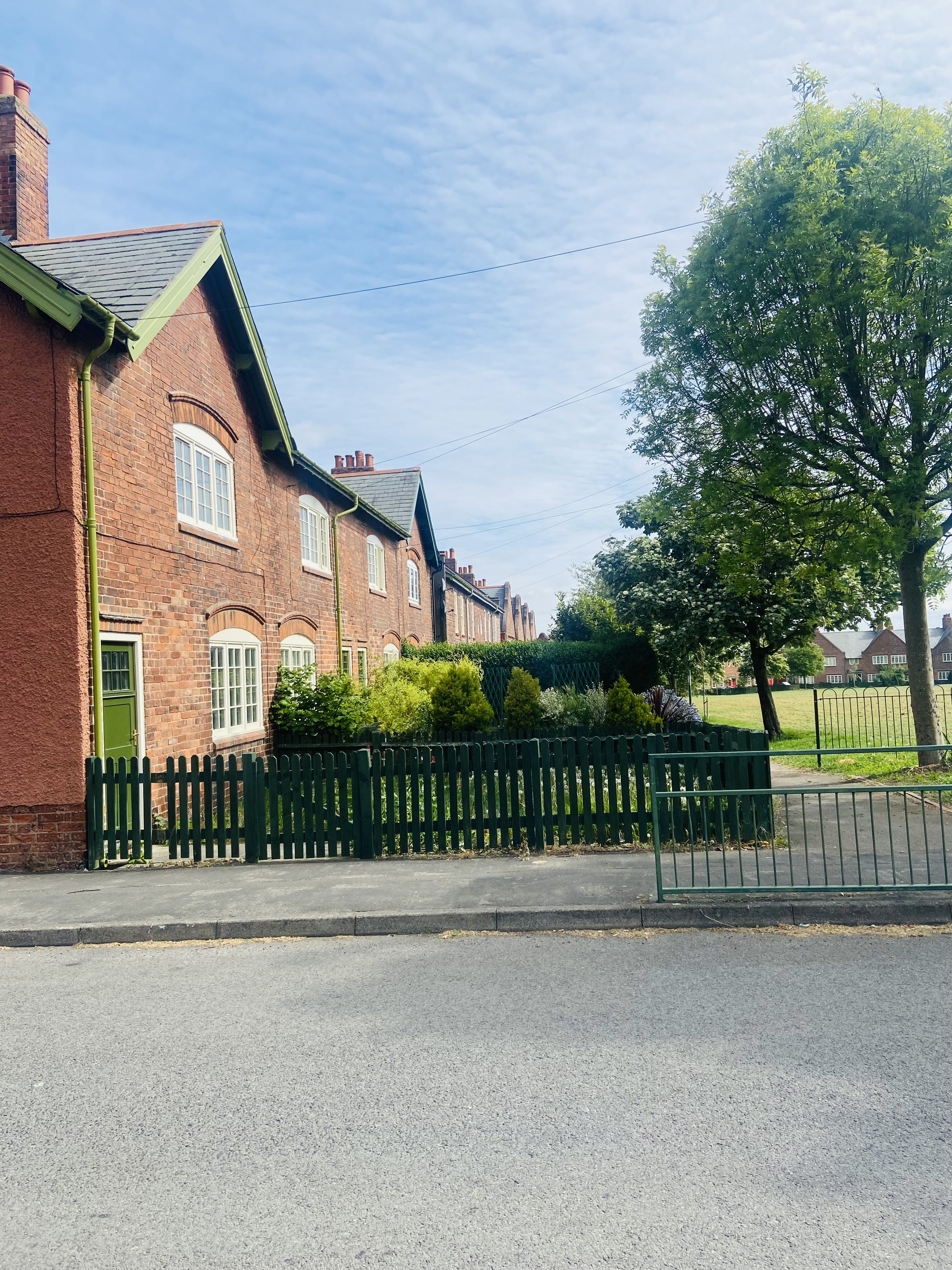
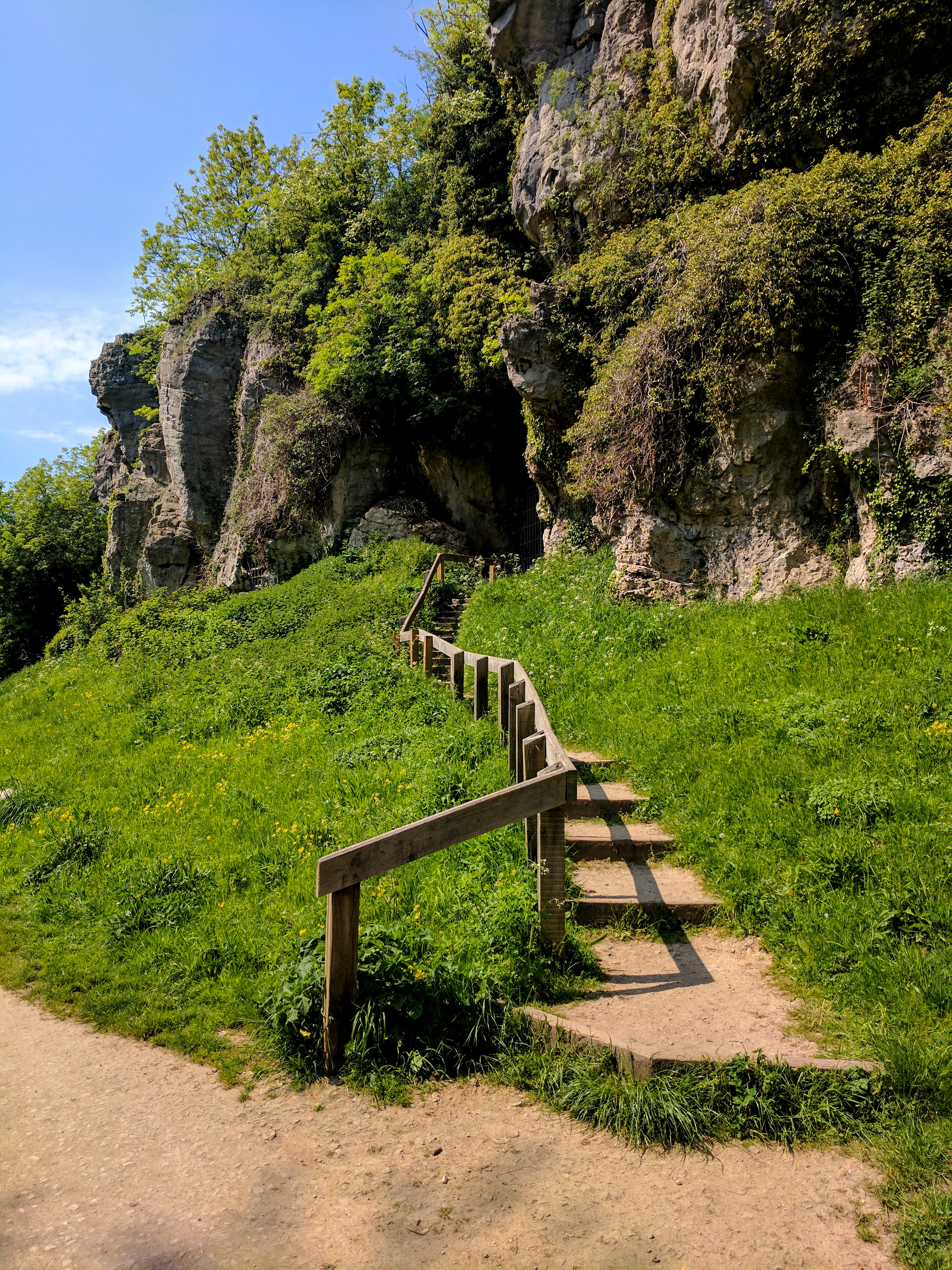
- St Mary Magdalene Church Model Village Creswell Crags

- Location within Derbyshire
- Population: 1,735
- District: Bolsover
- Shire county: Derbyshire
- Region: East Midlands
- Country: England
- Sovereign state: United Kingdom
- Post town: WORKSOP
- Postcode district: S80
- Dialling code: 01909
- Police: Derbyshire
- Fire: Derbyshire
- Ambulance: East Midlands
- UK Parliament: Bolsover
- Website: https://www.elmtonwithcreswellparish.org.uk/

Creswell is a village located in the Bolsover district of Derbyshire, England. At the 2011 Census population details were included in the civil parish of Elmton-with-Creswell. Today it is best known for Creswell Crags and its model village. Elmton Common is an area of allotments for the township of Creswell. The village was a mining village.

Local Government services are provided by Elmton-with-Creswell Parish Council, Bolsover District Council and Derbyshire County Council.

== Toponymy ==
The name of Creswell is Anglo Saxon in origin meaning watercress and well meaning stream or spring.

== History ==
Whilst Elmton is mentioned in the Domesday Book, Creswell remained a nearby collection of farming houses until the construction of a turnpike road along the present A616 brought added importance. The arrival of the coal-mining industry in the last decade of the 19th century had a dramatic effect on the area and Creswell became the larger community. The name Creswell arose because the colliery company needed an address for deliveries during construction. The closest farm was Creswell's Farm. As there was no town, all the machinery and boxes arrived with the delivery drop off of "Creswell's" written on them, and the name Creswell stuck.

Only Whitwell, Elmton and Thorp (Salvin) were original Saxon towns. Before Creswell Village was built, Creswell Crags was known locally as Whitwell Crags.

=== 20th century ===
Creswell expanded throughout the 20th century after a lease was obtained from the Duke of Portland in 1894 for the top hard seam of coal in the area and Creswell Colliery came into being. The Bolsover Colliery Company owned the pit until it was nationalised in 1947. Creswell Colliery was regarded as one of the most efficient pits in the East Midlands coalfield. The colliery was known for its sporting and social activities and Creswell Colliery Band was for a long time one of the country’s leading brass bands and had been broadcast several times on BBC Radio.

Creswell Model Village was built in 1895 to house the coal-mining families. Expansion of housing continued throughout the 20th century. Creswell is in Derbyshire but close to the borders of Nottinghamshire and Yorkshire. Creswell has a Worksop postal address with a South Yorkshire postcode, though Derbyshire can be used in the postal address. Creswell Colliery was in the North Nottinghamshire coalfield but miners holidayed at the Derbyshire Miners' Holiday Camp.

==== Creswell Colliery mining disaster, 1950 ====
In September 1950 Creswell Colliery was the scene of one of the worst post-nationalisation mining disasters.

In the early hours of 26 September 1950, a damaged conveyor belt caught in a machine at the colliery, causing the motor to overheat and catch fire trapping 80 men beyond the flames. They all perished as a result of the fumes and smoke. As word of the disaster spread, Creswell residents rushed to the pithead to offer assistance. One miner, who had broken his back several months before, went down the stricken pit, with a back brace on, to rescue his fellow workers. Serious errors prevented the fire from being extinguished quickly and only 57 bodies were initially recovered and 23 remained underground for the best part of a year. The fire was finally put out after the entire colliery had been sealed to starve it of oxygen, and it did not reopen until Easter 1951, when most of the remaining bodies were recovered. The last three victims were recovered on 11 August 1951, nearly eleven months after the fire.

The inquiry, presided over by the Minister of Fuel and Power Geoffrey Lloyd, described a number of factors involved in the high death rate, including telephones being too far from the face, repair work being done on the "paddy" (the underground train used to convey the men to and from the lift shaft), inadequate air shafts and low water pressure in the fire hoses.

== Amenities ==
Creswell had two railway stations. Creswell & Welbeck (known locally as Top Station) was opened by the LD&ECR in 1897 and closed in September 1939. Elmton and Creswell (known as Bottom Station) was on the Midland Railway line running between Worksop and Nottingham. The line and station closed in October 1964, leaving the village without a rail service. From 1993 the line was reopened northwards from Nottingham in stages under the name Robin Hood Line. The final section from Mansfield Woodhouse to Worksop was reopened in 1998, with the old Bottom Station reopening as plain "Creswell".

During the 20th century the landscape was scarred by a century of mining with the black spoil tips of debris from miles underground, air-borne pollution from pit chimneys and poor architecture and housing.

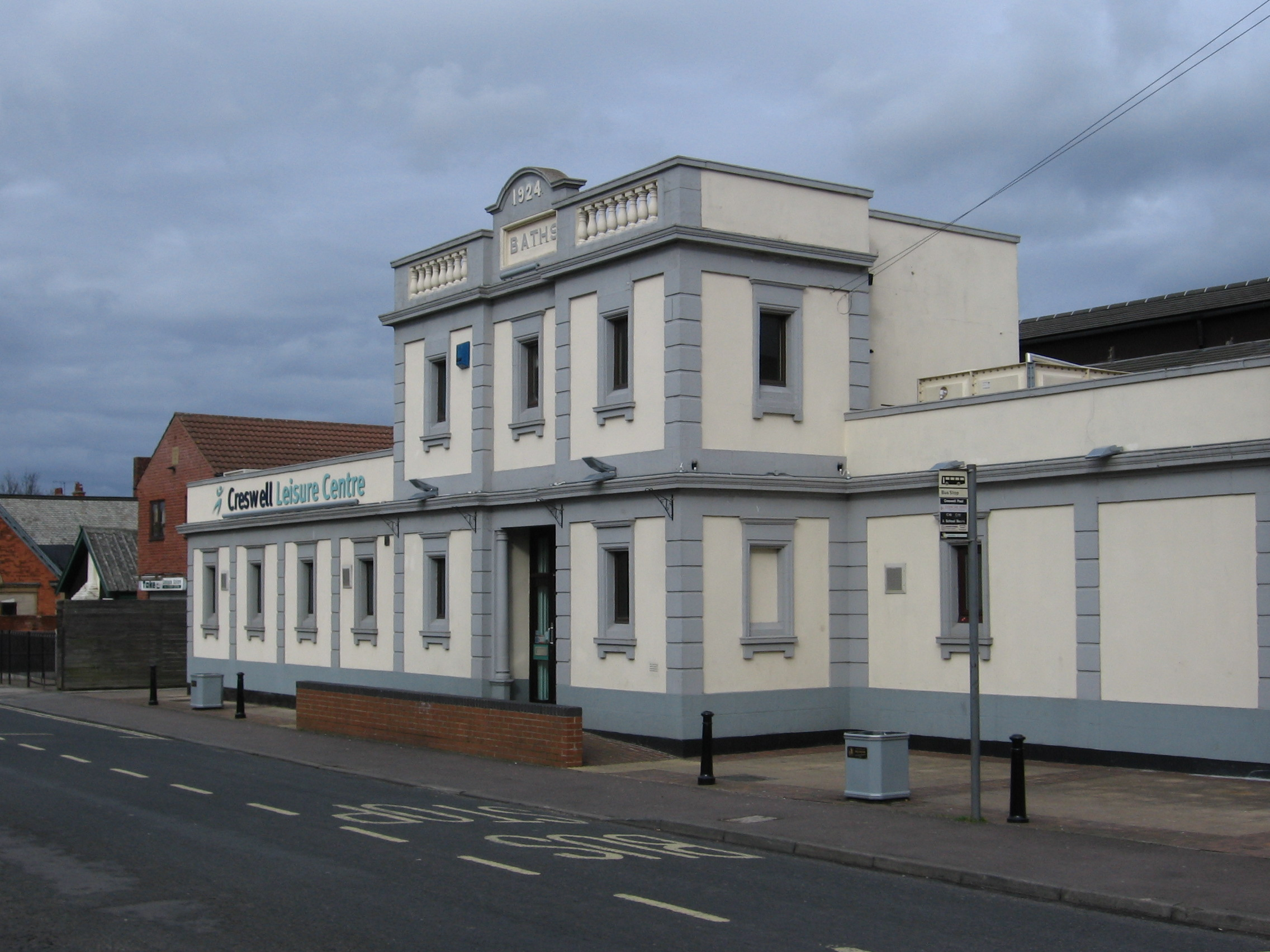
Leisure Centre (including swimming baths)

By the mid-20th century Creswell supported facilities not to be found in other villages, such as a cinema and some baths. The original cinema was in King Street, but in the 1930s it burned down and was replaced. The new cinema on Elmton Road was a stylish art deco structure, built by the Rogers family and called the Regors. Like many others it became a bingo hall in the late 1960s. The baths were built in 1924. As a council facility they included not only a swimming pool but also slipper baths for the many homes that did not have their own bathrooms at that date.

The village had one main Church of England parish church, St Mary Magdalene's Church, Creswell, and both a Methodist and Baptist chapel. A third chapel had been closed down and was then used as part of the Infant School. A Roman Catholic church was built in the late 1950s.

Creswell Colliery closed in the early 1990s, after the UK miners' strike (1984–1985). Creswell, like many other communities throughout the UK, had to look for a new direction. A significant drop in population took place.

The Creswell Social Centre (previously called The Drill Hall) has always been the hub of the village, hosting parties and weddings along with sports and entertainment such as wrestling and boxing.

Beyond the village, the landscape has two unusual features, Creswell Crags and Markland Grips. Both are dolomitic limestone gorges, but the former is more important as the caves within it have been found to contain not only prehistoric artefacts but also cave art.

== See also ==
- Listed buildings in Elmton with Creswell
