= John W. Creswell =

American academic

John W. Creswell Cheska Rein Tarnate
- Born: John Ward Creswell
- Education: Muskingum College (BA); University of Iowa (MA, PhD)
- Known for: Mixed methods research
- Awards: Two Fulbright Scholarships (2008, 2012)
- Scientific career
- Fields: Educational psychology
- Workplaces: University of Nebraska–Lincoln; University of Michigan
- Thesis: A Study of Faculty Acceptance of a Faculty Information Survey (1974)

John Ward Creswell is an American academician known for his work in mixed methods research. He has written numerous journal articles and 27 books on mixed methods research, research methods, and qualitative research.

== Education ==
Creswell earned a Bachelor of Arts degree in political science and history from Muskingum University. He then earned a Master of Arts in student personnel and counseling and a PhD in sociology and higher education studies from the University of Iowa.

== Career ==
Since 2015, he has been an adjunct professor of family medicine at the University of Michigan and co-director of the Michigan Mixed Methods Research and Scholarship Program. He was formerly a professor of educational psychology at the University of Nebraska–Lincoln, where he held the Clifton Endowed Professor Chair. He was a founding co-editor of the Journal of Mixed Methods Research, and was a Fulbright Scholar twice, in 2008 in South Africa and in 2012 in Thailand. He was a visiting professor at the Harvard School of Public Health in 2013 and received an honorary doctorate from the University of Pretoria in 2014.
