= Millie Criswell =

American novelist

- Occupation: Novelist
- Children: 2
- Writing career
- Language: English
- Genre: Romance

Millie Criswell is an American author of over twenty-five romance novels.

She began writing shortly before her fortieth birthday, after decades of reading romances. She has since published over twenty-five novels, and is the lead author for the new Harlequin Flipside line.

== Awards ==
- Romantic Times Career Achievement Award winner
- National Readers Choice Award winner
- Reviewer's Choice Award winner
- Georgia Romance Writers MAGGIE award winner
- Dorothy Parker Award of Excellence winner

== Bibliography ==
Italian Series (Modern)

- The Trouble With Mary
- What to Do About Annie
- The Trials of Angela
- Mad About Mia

The Law Man Trilogy

- Desperate Rafe and Emma
- Dangerous Ethan
- Defiant Travis

Flowers of the West Trilogy

- Wild Heather Book 1
- Sweet LaurelBook 2
- Prim Rose Book 3
- Asking for Trouble
- No Strings Attached
- Body Language
- Suddenly Single
- The Trials of Angela
- Staying Single
- Christmas Eve
- The Pregnant Miss Potter
- The Marrying Man
- The Wedding Planner
- True Love
