= St Mary Magdalene's Church, Creswell =

St Mary Magdalene’s Church, Creswell
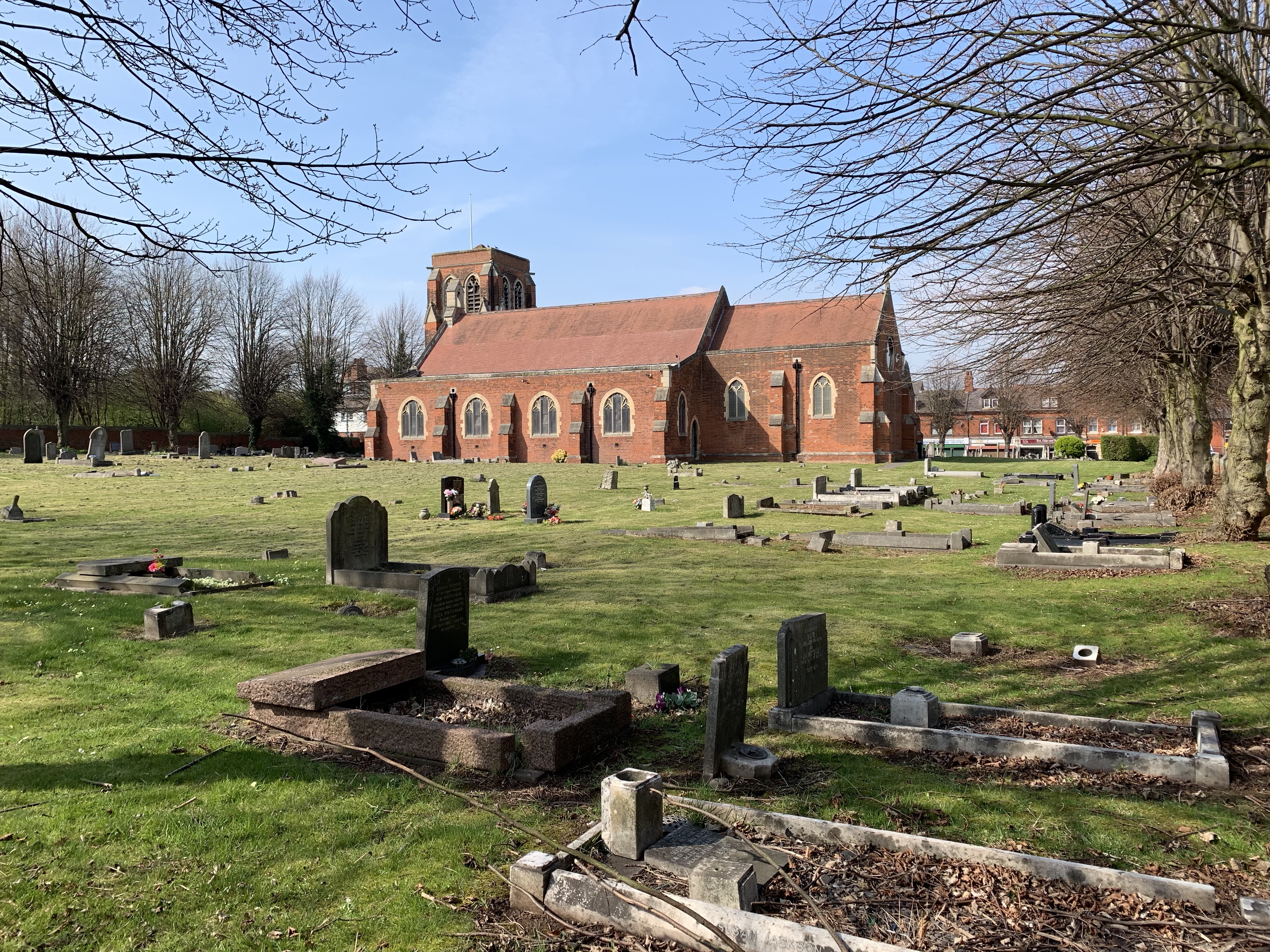
- St Mary Magdalene’s Church, Creswell

- Location within Derbyshire
- 53°15′45.87″N 1°12′45.27″W
- Location: Creswell, Derbyshire
- Country: England
- Denomination: Church of England

History
- Dedication: Mary Magdalene
- Consecrated: 17 May 1900

Architecture
- Heritage designation: Grade II listed
- Architect: Louis Ambler
- Groundbreaking: 23 May 1899

Administration
- Province: Canterbury
- Diocese: Derby
- Archdeaconry: Chesterfield
- Deanery: North East Derbyshire
- Parish: Elmton with Creswell

St Mary Magdalene's Church, Creswell is a Grade II listed parish church in the Church of England in Creswell, Derbyshire.

== History ==
The foundation stone was laid on Tuesday 23 May 1899 by William Cavendish-Bentinck, 6th Duke of Portland. It was built to designs by the architect Louis Ambler at a cost of £4,500 (equivalent to £500,000 in 2025), the gift of the Duke. The contractor was Messrs Burman and Sons of Stamford.

It was consecrated on 17 May 1900 by Rt. Revd George Ridding, Bishop of Southwell.

The vestry was added in 1906 at a cost of £250 (equivalent to £26,300 in 2025).

The Aisles were added in 1914. The tower was built in 1927 at a cost of £4,000 (equivalent to £217,300 in 2025) which included a peal of 8 bells from John Taylor of Loughborough.

== Organ ==
The organ was built at a cost of £450 (equivalent to £47,800 in 2025) and opened with a recital on 21 September 1900 by Harrison Cooper, organist of St Andrew's Presbyterian Church, Sheffield.

== Stained glass windows ==
The stained glass windows include two by Clare Dawson of 1951, the east window and the Miners' Memorial.
