= Bolsover Colliery Company =

- Company type: Plc
- Industry: Mining
- Founded: 1899
- Defunct: 1947 (Nationalised)
- Fate: Nationalised
- Successor: National Coal Board
- Headquarters: Bolsover, Derbyshire, England
- Products: Coal

The Bolsover Colliery Company was a major mining concern established to extract coal from land owned by the Duke of Portland. At its peak the business was a constituent of the FT 30 index of leading companies on the London Stock Exchange.

== History ==
The company was founded in 1889 by Emerson Muschamp Bainbridge, a Northumberland born mine owner, who secured a lease from the Duke of Portland for land at Bolsover in Derbyshire and started shaft sinking to reach the coal in 1891. The general manager of the company at this time was John Plowright Houfton, who was knighted for his work for the local community in 1929.

Bainbridge secured the rights to mine coal at Creswell in 1894 and shaft sinking for Creswell Colliery began under the direction of J. P. Houfton in September that year. Coal was reached at 450 yards and production began in 1897. The colliery had two shafts and access to between three and four square miles of coal reserves. By 1901 the colliery was producing 2700 to 3000 tons of coal daily and in the July, 3001 tons was delivered to the surface in one day, a world record for coal production at the time. A model village was built to accommodate some of the workforce.

In 1899 Bainbridge secured a further lease from the Duke of Portland for land at Crown Farm near Mansfield in Nottinghamshire: coal was reached in 1905.

Subsequent leases were secured from Earl Manvers and Lord Savile allowing collieries to be established at Rufford, Clipstone and Thoresby in Nottinghamshire where coal was reached 1913, 1922 and 1928 respectively.

In 1933 the company's Bolsover, Clipstone, Creswell, Mansfield, Rufford and Thorsby Collieries employed 9,369 men extracting 4.5 million tons of coal from the Top Hard, Waterloo and High Hazel seams.

== Demise of the business ==
The company's collieries were acquired by the National Coal Board on nationalisation in 1947. Bolsover Colliery closed in 1993 and Creswell Colliery closed in 1991.
