= Results of the 2007 United Kingdom local elections (district councils) =

== District councils ==
=== Whole council ===
In 153 English district authorities the whole council was up for election.

Council	Previous control	Result	Details
Allerdale	No overall control	No overall control hold	Details
Alnwick	No overall control	No overall control hold	Details
Arun	Conservative	Conservative hold	Details
Ashfield	Labour	No overall control	Details
Ashford	Conservative	Conservative hold	Details
Aylesbury Vale	Conservative	Conservative hold	Details
Babergh	No overall control	No overall control hold	Details
Berwick-upon-Tweed	No overall control	No overall control hold	Details
Blaby	Conservative	Conservative hold	Details
Blyth Valley	Labour	Labour hold	Details
Bolsover	Labour	Labour hold	Details
Boston	No overall control	Boston Bypass Independents gain	Details
Braintree	No overall control	Conservative gain	Details
Breckland	Conservative	Conservative hold	Details
Bridgnorth	No overall control	No overall control hold	Details
Broadland	Conservative	Conservative hold	Details
Bromsgrove	Conservative	Conservative hold	Details
Broxtowe	No overall control	No overall control hold	Details
Canterbury	No overall control	Conservative gain	Details
Caradon	No overall control	Liberal Democrats gain	Details
Carrick	Liberal Democrats	No overall control	Details
Castle Morpeth	No overall control	No overall control hold	Details
Charnwood	No overall control	Conservative gain	Details
Chelmsford	Conservative	Conservative hold	Details
Chester-le-Street	Labour	Labour hold	Details
Chesterfield	Liberal Democrats	Liberal Democrats hold	Details
Chichester	Conservative	Conservative hold	Details
Chiltern	Conservative	Conservative hold	Details
Christchurch	Conservative	Conservative hold	Details
Copeland	Labour	Labour hold	Details
Corby	Labour	Labour hold	Details
Cotswold	Conservative	Conservative hold	Details
Dacorum	Conservative	Conservative hold	Details
Dartford	No overall control	Conservative gain	Details
Derbyshire Dales	Conservative	Conservative hold	Details
Derwentside	Labour	Labour hold	Details
Dover	No overall control	Conservative gain	Details
Durham	Liberal Democrats	Liberal Democrats hold	
Easington	Labour	Labour hold	Details
Eastbourne	Conservative	Liberal Democrats gain	Details
East Cambridgeshire	No overall control	Conservative gain	Details
East Devon	Conservative	Conservative hold	Details
East Dorset	Conservative	Conservative hold	Details
East Hampshire	Conservative	Conservative hold	Details
East Hertfordshire	Conservative	Conservative hold	Details
East Lindsey	No overall control	No overall control hold	Details
East Northamptonshire	Conservative	Conservative hold	Details
East Staffordshire	Conservative	Conservative hold	Details
Eden	Independent	No overall control	Details
Epsom and Ewell	Residents Association	Residents Association hold	Details
Erewash	No overall control	Conservative gain	Details
Fenland	Conservative	Conservative hold	Details
Forest Heath	Conservative	Conservative hold	Details
Forest of Dean	No overall control	Conservative gain	Details
Fylde	Conservative	Conservative hold	Details
Gedling	No overall control	Conservative gain	Details
Gravesham	Labour	Conservative gain	Details
Guildford	Conservative	Conservative hold	Details
Hambleton	Conservative	Conservative hold	Details
Harborough	No overall control	Conservative gain	Details
High Peak	No overall control	Conservative gain	Details
Hinckley and Bosworth	Conservative	Liberal Democrats gain	Details
Horsham	Conservative	Conservative hold	Details
Kennet	Conservative	Conservative hold	Details
Kerrier	Independent	No overall control	Details
Kettering	Conservative	Conservative hold	Details
King's Lynn and West Norfolk	Conservative	Conservative hold	Details
Lancaster	No overall control	No overall control hold	Details
Lewes	Liberal Democrats	Liberal Democrats hold	Details
Lichfield	Conservative	Conservative hold	Details
Lincoln	Labour	Conservative gain	Details
Maldon	Conservative	Conservative hold	Details
Malvern Hills	No overall control	Conservative gain	Details
Mansfield	Independent	Independent hold	Details
Melton	Conservative	Conservative hold	Details
Mendip	Conservative	Conservative hold	Details
Mid Bedfordshire	Conservative	Conservative hold	Details
Mid Devon	No overall control	No overall control hold	Details
Mid Suffolk	No overall control	Conservative gain	Details
Mid Sussex	No overall control	Conservative gain	Details
New Forest	Conservative	Conservative hold	Details
Newark and Sherwood	No overall control	Conservative gain	Details
North Cornwall	No overall control	No overall control hold	Details
North Devon	Liberal Democrats	Conservative gain	Details
North Dorset	No overall control	Conservative gain	Details
North East Derbyshire	Labour	Labour hold	Details
North Hertfordshire	Conservative	Conservative hold	Details
North Kesteven	No overall control	Conservative gain	Details
North Norfolk	Liberal Democrats	Liberal Democrats hold	Details
North Shropshire	No overall control	Conservative gain	Details
North Warwickshire	No overall control	Conservative gain	Details
North West Leicestershire	Labour	Conservative gain	Details
North Wiltshire	No overall control	Conservative gain	Details
Northampton	No overall control	Liberal Democrats gain	Details
Oadby and Wigston	Liberal Democrats	Liberal Democrats hold	Details
Oswestry	No overall control	Conservative gain	Details
Restormel	No overall control	No overall control hold	Details
Ribble Valley	Conservative	Conservative hold	Details
Richmondshire	Independent	No overall control	Details
Rother	Conservative	Conservative hold	Details
Rushcliffe	Conservative	Conservative hold	Details
Ryedale	No overall control	No overall control hold	Details
Salisbury	Conservative	No overall control	Details
Scarborough	Conservative	No overall control	Details
Sedgefield	Labour	Labour hold	Details
Sedgemoor	Conservative	Conservative hold	Details
Selby	Conservative	Conservative hold	Details
Sevenoaks	Conservative	Conservative hold	Details
Shepway	No overall control	Conservative gain	Details
South Bucks	Conservative	Conservative hold	Details
South Derbyshire	Labour	Conservative gain	Details
South Hams	Conservative	Conservative hold	Details
South Holland	Conservative	Conservative hold	Details
South Kesteven	Conservative	Conservative hold	Details
South Norfolk	Liberal Democrats	Conservative gain	Details
South Northamptonshire	Conservative	Conservative hold	Details
South Oxfordshire	Conservative	Conservative hold	Details
South Ribble	No overall control	Conservative gain	Details
South Shropshire	No overall control	Conservative gain	Details
South Somerset	Liberal Democrats	Liberal Democrats hold	Details
South Staffordshire	Conservative	Conservative hold	Details
Spelthorne	Conservative	Conservative hold	Details
St Edmundsbury	Conservative	Conservative hold	Details
Stafford	Conservative	Conservative hold	Details
Staffordshire Moorlands	No overall control	Conservative gain	Details
Suffolk Coastal	Conservative	Conservative hold	Details
Surrey Heath	Conservative	Conservative hold	Details
Taunton Deane	Conservative	No overall control	Details
Teesdale	Independent	Independent hold	Details
Teignbridge	No overall control	No overall control hold	Details
Tendring	No overall control	No overall control hold	Details
Test Valley	Conservative	Conservative hold	Details
Tewkesbury	No overall control	No overall control hold	Details
Thanet	Conservative	Conservative hold	Details
Tonbridge and Malling	Conservative	Conservative hold	Details
Torridge	Independent	No overall control	Details
Tynedale	Conservative	Conservative hold	Details
Uttlesford	Liberal Democrats	Conservative gain	Details
Vale of White Horse	Liberal Democrats	Liberal Democrats hold	Details
Vale Royal	No overall control	No overall control hold	Details
Wansbeck	Labour	Labour hold	Details
Warwick	No overall control	Conservative gain	Details
Waverley	No overall control	Conservative gain	Details
Wealden	Conservative	Conservative hold	Details
Wear Valley	Labour	No overall control	Details
Wellingborough	Conservative	Conservative hold	Details
West Devon	No overall control	No overall control hold	Details
West Dorset	Conservative	Conservative hold	Details
West Somerset	Conservative	Independent gain	Details
West Wiltshire	No overall control	Conservative gain	Details
Wychavon	Conservative	Conservative hold	Details
Wycombe	Conservative	Conservative hold	Details
Wyre	Conservative	Conservative hold	Details

=== Third of council ===
In 78 English district authorities one third of the council was up for election.

Council	Previous control	Result	Details
Amber Valley	Conservative	Conservative hold	Details
Barrow-in-Furness	No overall control	No overall control hold	Details
Basildon	Conservative	Conservative hold	Details
Basingstoke and Deane	Conservative	Conservative hold	Details
Bassetlaw	Conservative	Conservative hold	Details
Bedford	No overall control	No overall control hold	Details
Brentwood	Conservative	Conservative hold	Details
Broxbourne	Conservative	Conservative hold	Details
Burnley	No overall control	No overall control hold	Details
Cambridge	Liberal Democrats	Liberal Democrats hold	Details
Cannock Chase	No overall control	No overall control hold	Details
Carlisle	No overall control	No overall control hold	Details
Castle Point	Conservative	Conservative hold	Details
Cherwell	Conservative	Conservative hold	Details
Chester	No overall control	Conservative gain	Details
Chorley	Conservative	Conservative hold	Details
Colchester	No overall control	No overall control hold	Details
Congleton	Conservative	Conservative hold	Details
Craven	No overall control	No overall control hold	Details
Crawley	Conservative	Conservative hold	Details
Crewe and Nantwich	No overall control	No overall control hold	Details
Daventry	Conservative	Conservative hold	Details
Eastleigh	Liberal Democrats	Liberal Democrats hold	Details
Ellesmere Port and Neston	Labour	Labour hold	Details
Elmbridge	No overall control	No overall control hold	Details
Epping Forest	Conservative	Conservative hold	Details
Exeter	No overall control	No overall control hold	Details
Gloucester	No overall control	No overall control hold	Details
Great Yarmouth	Conservative	Conservative hold	Details
Harlow	No overall control	No overall control hold	Details
Harrogate	No overall control	No overall control hold	Details
Hart	No overall control	No overall control hold	Details
Havant	Conservative	Conservative hold	Details
Hertsmere	Conservative	Conservative hold	Details
Huntingdonshire	Conservative	Conservative hold	Details
Hyndburn	Conservative	Conservative hold	Details
Ipswich	No overall control	No overall control hold	Details
Macclesfield	Conservative	Conservative hold	Details
Maidstone	No overall control	No overall control hold	Details
Mole Valley	Conservative	Conservative hold	Details
Newcastle-under-Lyme	No overall control	No overall control hold	Details
Norwich	No overall control	No overall control hold	Details
Pendle	Liberal Democrats	Liberal Democrats hold	Details
Penwith	No overall control	No overall control hold	Details
Preston	No overall control	No overall control hold	Details
Purbeck	Conservative	Conservative hold	Details
Redditch	No overall control	No overall control hold	Details
Reigate and Banstead	Conservative	Conservative hold	Details
Rochford	Conservative	Conservative hold	Details
Rossendale	Conservative	Conservative hold	Details
Rugby	No overall control	Conservative gain	Details
Runnymede	Conservative	Conservative hold	Details
Rushmoor	Conservative	Conservative hold	Details
Shrewsbury and Atcham	Conservative	Conservative hold	Details
South Bedfordshire	Conservative	Conservative hold	Details
South Cambridgeshire	No overall control	Conservative gain	Details
South Lakeland	Liberal Democrats	Liberal Democrats hold	Details
St Albans	Liberal Democrats	No overall control	Details
Stevenage	Labour	Labour hold	Details
Stratford-on-Avon	Conservative	Conservative hold	Details
Stroud	Conservative	Conservative hold	Details
Swale	Conservative	Conservative hold	Details
Tamworth	Conservative	Conservative hold	Details
Tandridge	Conservative	Conservative hold	Details
Three Rivers	Liberal Democrats	Liberal Democrats hold	Details
Tunbridge Wells	Conservative	Conservative hold	Details
Watford	Liberal Democrats	Liberal Democrats hold	Details
Waveney	Conservative	Conservative hold	Details
Welwyn Hatfield	Conservative	Conservative hold	Details
West Lancashire	Conservative	Conservative hold	Details
West Lindsey	Liberal Democrats	Liberal Democrats hold	Details
West Oxfordshire	Conservative	Conservative hold	Details
Weymouth and Portland	No overall control	No overall control hold	Details
Winchester	Conservative	Conservative hold	Details
Woking	No overall control	Conservative gain	Details
Worcester	Conservative	Conservative hold	Details
Worthing	Conservative	Conservative hold	Details
Wyre Forest	No overall control	No overall control hold	Details
