= North Dorset District Council elections =

Local government elections in Dorset, England

Map showing the composition of North Dorset District Council as of the last election in 2015. Conservatives in blue, Liberal Democrats in yellow and independents in grey.

North Dorset District Council in Dorset, England existed from 1974 to 2019, when it was abolished and subsumed into Dorset Council.

== Political control ==
From the first election to the council in 1973 until its abolition in 2019, political control was held by the following parties:

Party in control	Years
Independent	1973–1995
Liberal Democrats	1995–1999
No overall control	1999–2007
Conservative	2007–2019

=== Leadership ===
The leaders of the council from 2012 until the council's abolition in 2019 were:

Councillor	Party	From	To
Peter Webb	Conservative		28 Sep 2012
Deborah Croney	Conservative	28 Sep 2012	29 Jul 2016
Graham Carr-Jones	Conservative	29 Jul 2016	31 Mar 2019

== Council elections ==
- 1973 North Dorset District Council election
- 1976 North Dorset District Council election
- 1979 North Dorset District Council election
- 1983 North Dorset District Council election (New ward boundaries)
- 1987 North Dorset District Council election
- 1991 North Dorset District Council election (District boundary changes took place but the number of seats remained the same)
- 1995 North Dorset District Council election
- 1999 North Dorset District Council election
- 2003 North Dorset District Council election (New ward boundaries)
- 2007 North Dorset District Council election
- 2011 North Dorset District Council election
- 2015 North Dorset District Council election (New ward boundaries)

== Council composition ==
Year	Conservative	Liberal Democrats	Independent	Council control after election
1999	16	10	7 (Note: Includes 1 independent conservative.)	No overall control
2003	15	11	7	No overall control
2007	17	13	3	Conservative
2011	23	6	4	Conservative
2015	27	4	2	Conservative

== District result maps ==
2003 results map

2007 results map

2011 results map

2015 results map

== By-election results ==
=== 1995-1999 ===
Blandford West By-Election 9 January 1997
Party	Candidate	Votes	%	±%
Liberal Democrats		413	45.6	
Conservative		316	34.9	
Labour		176	19.4	
Majority		97	10.7	
Turnout		905	23.7	
Liberal Democrats hold		Swing		

Riverside By-Election 26 November 1998
Party	Candidate	Votes	%	±%
Liberal Democrats		231	62.4	+22.2
Labour		139	37.6	+18.0
Majority		92	34.8	
Turnout		370	28.0	
Liberal Democrats hold		Swing		

=== 1999-2003 ===
Gillingham Town By-Election 4 October 2001
Party	Candidate	Votes	%	±%
Liberal Democrats		243	58.0	+22.3
Conservative		119	28.4	−5.3
Independent		57	13.6	−17.1
Majority		124	29.6	
Turnout		419	29.0	
Liberal Democrats hold		Swing		

Wyke By-Election 4 October 2001
Party	Candidate	Votes	%	±%
Conservative	Stephen James	434	46.8	−4.7
Liberal Democrats	Ann Beckley	374	40.3	+19.3
Independent	Su Hunt	119	12.8	−14.7
Majority		60	6.5	
Turnout		927	34.3	
Conservative hold		Swing		

=== 2003-2007 ===
Hill Forts By-Election 10 June 2004
Party	Candidate	Votes	%	±%
Liberal Democrats		1,149	58.1	+18.9
Conservative		775	39.2	−12.6
Labour		52	2.6	+2.6
Majority		374	18.9	
Turnout		1,976	62.0	
Liberal Democrats gain from Conservative		Swing		

Lodbourne By-Election 7 July 2005
Party	Candidate	Votes	%	±%
Liberal Democrats		308	57.6	+57.6
Independent		131	24.5	+24.5
Independent		96	17.9	+17.9
Majority		177	33.1	
Turnout		535	35.5	
Liberal Democrats hold		Swing		

Lydden Vale By-Election 6 July 2006
Party	Candidate	Votes	%	±%
Liberal Democrats	David Fox	429	57.0	+47.4
Conservative	Ian Johns	324	43.0	+28.5
Majority		105	14.0	
Turnout		753	50.0	
Liberal Democrats gain from Independent		Swing		

=== 2011-2015 ===
Lodbourne By-Election 21 March 2013
Party	Candidate	Votes	%	±%
Liberal Democrats	Richard Arnold	187	47.9	+0.1
Conservative	Mike Gould	134	34.4	−17.8
Labour	Bob Messer	69	17.7	+17.7
Majority		53	13.6	
Turnout		390		
Liberal Democrats gain from Conservative		Swing		

The Stours By-Election 21 March 2013
Party	Candidate	Votes	%	±%
Conservative	Traci Handford	207	80.2	+11.8
Labour	Joseph Pestell	51	19.8	+19.8
Majority		156	60.5	
Turnout		258		
Conservative hold		Swing		

=== 2015-2019 ===
Blanford Hilltop By-Election 5 May 2016
Party	Candidate	Votes	%	±%
Conservative	Traci Handford	176	32.5	−14.8
Liberal Democrats	Hugo Mieville	170	31.4	n/a
Labour	Haydn White	100	18.5	+8.1
UKIP	William Woodhouse	96	17.7	−3.2
Majority		6	1.1	
Turnout			34.5	
Conservative hold		Swing		

Hill Forts By-Election 5 May 2016
Party	Candidate	Votes	%	±%
Conservative	Piers Brown	946	48.4	+4.3
UKIP	John England	417	21.3	+0.7
Liberal Democrats	David Tibbles	318	16.3	n/a
Labour	Keith Yarwood	273	14.0	−0.2
Majority		529	27.1	
Turnout			39.6	
Conservative hold		Swing		

Gillingham Town By-Election 4 May 2017
Party	Candidate	Votes	%	±%
Conservative	Alexander Chase	678	46.2	+11.0
Liberal Democrats	Barry von Clemens	660	45.0	+13.0
UKIP	Peter Caulfield	129	8.8	+8.8
Majority		18	1.2	
Turnout		1,467		
Conservative gain from Liberal Democrats		Swing		

Blandford Central By-Election 27 July 2017
Party	Candidate	Votes	%	±%
Conservative	Noc Lacey-Clarke	310	36.6	+16.6
Labour	Haydn White	307	36.3	+25.1
Liberal Democrats	Hugo Mieville	229	27.1	+0.1
Majority		3	0.3	
Turnout				
Conservative gain from Independent		Swing		
