= 2011 North Dorset District Council election =

Local election in Dorset

Map showing the results of the 2011 North Dorset District Council election

Elections to North Dorset District Council were held on 5 May 2011, alongside other local elections across the United Kingdom. All 33 seats were up for election. The Conservative Party retained control of the council.

== Results summary ==
2011 North Dorset election
Party	Seats before	Seats after	Change
Conservative Party	17	23	▲6
Liberal Democrats	13	5	▼7
Other	3	4	▲1

== See also ==
- North Dorset District Council elections
