= 2006 Exeter City Council election =

2006 UK local government election

← 2004	4 May 2006	2007 →

13 of the 40 seats to Exeter City Council 21 seats needed for a majority
- Turnout: 37.2%
	First party	Second party
Party	Labour	Liberal Democrats
Last election	19	12
Seats before	18	13
Seats won	5	3
Seats after	16	12
Seat change	▼2	▼1
Popular vote	6,954	5,606
Percentage	30.3%	24.5%
	Third party	Fourth party
Party	Conservative	Liberal
Last election	5	4
Seats before	5	5
Seats won	4	1
Seats after	8	4
Seat change	▲3	Steady
Popular vote	7,131	1,253
Percentage	31.1%	5.5%
- Map showing the results of the 2006 Exeter City Council elections by ward. Red shows Labour seats, blue shows the Conservatives, yellow shows the Liberal Democrats and orange shows the Liberals. Wards in white had no election.
Council control before election
No overall control
Council control after election
No overall control

The 2006 Exeter City Council election took place on 4 May 2006, to elect members of Exeter City Council in Devon, England. The election was held concurrently with other local elections in England. One third of the council was up for election and the council remained under no overall control.

== Results summary ==
2006 Exeter City Council election
Party	This election			Full council			This election		
Party	Seats	Net	Seats %	Other	Total	Total %	Votes	Votes %	+/−
Labour	4	▼2	30.8	12	16	40.0	6,954	30.3	+0.5
Liberal Democrats	3	▼1	23.1	9	12	30.0	5,778	25.2	-2.3
Conservative	5	▲3	38.5	3	8	20.0	6,959	30.4	+0.7
Liberal	1	Steady	7.7	3	4	10.0	1,253	5.5	-0.5
Green	0	Steady	0.0	0	0	0.0	1,465	6.4	+1.0
UKIP	0	Steady	0.0	0	0	0.0	504	2.2	+1.6

== Ward results ==
=== Alphington ===
Alphington
Party	Candidate	Votes	%
Liberal Democrats	Paul Smith	906	40.4%
Conservative	Margaret Jordan	705	31.4%
Labour	Paul Bull	398	17.8%
Green	Andrew Bell	233	10.4%
Majority		201	9.0%
Turnout		2,242	
Liberal Democrats hold			

=== Cowick ===
Cowick
Party	Candidate	Votes	%
Conservative	Margaret Baldwin	680	39.6%
Labour	Allan Hart	570	33.2%
Liberal Democrats	Adrian Stone	302	17.6%
UKIP	David Challice	105	6.1%
Liberal	Peter Smith	61	3.6%
Majority		110	6.4%
Turnout		1,718	
Conservative gain from Labour			

=== Duryard ===
Duryard
Party	Candidate	Votes	%
Liberal Democrats	Ben Nobel	577	42.9%
Conservative	Jeffrey Coates	499	37.1%
Labour	Dorothy Parker	138	10.3%
Green	Isaac Price-Sosner	130	9.7%
Majority		78	5.8%
Turnout		1,344	
Liberal Democrats hold			

=== Exwick ===
Exwick
Party	Candidate	Votes	%
Labour	Connel Boyle	811	36.7%
Liberal Democrats	Rodney Ruffle	710	32.1%
Conservative	Patricia White	294	13.3%
UKIP	Lawrence Harper	163	7.4%
Green	Rebecca Worthley	134	6.1%
Liberal	Janet Gale	100	4.5%
Majority		101	4.6%
Turnout		2,212	
Labour hold			

=== Heavitree ===
Heavitree
Party	Candidate	Votes	%
Liberal	Christopher Gale	638	35.4%
Labour	Richard Harris	376	20.9%
Liberal Democrats	Will Morris	324	18.0%
Conservative	Louis Ten-Holter	285	15.8%
Green	Susan Greenall	180	10.0%
Majority		262	14.5%
Turnout		1,803	
Liberal hold			

=== Mincinglake & Whipton ===
Mincinglake & Whipton
Party	Candidate	Votes	%
Labour	Ian Martin	610	51.7%
Conservative	David Henson	369	31.3%
Liberal Democrats	Sandra Barrett	200	17.0%
Majority		241	20.4%
Turnout		1,179	
Labour hold			

=== Newtown ===
Newtown
Party	Candidate	Votes	%
Labour	Peter Shepherd	563	44.3%
Conservative	Dale Woolner	278	21.9%
Green	Susannah Cornwall	228	17.9%
Liberal Democrats	Pamela Thickett	203	16.0%
Majority		285	22.4%
Turnout		1,272	
Labour hold			

=== Pennsylvania ===
Pennsylvania
Party	Candidate	Votes	%
Liberal Democrats	Alexander Bond	777	43.5%
Conservative	Vanessa Newcombe	605	33.8%
Labour	Roger Spackman	282	15.8%
Green	Paul Edwards	124	6.9%
Majority		172	9.6%
Turnout		1,788	
Conservative gain from Liberal Democrats			

=== Pinhoe ===
Pinhoe
Party	Candidate	Votes	%
Conservative	Ruth Smith	1,071	48.4%
Labour	Gregory Sheldon	735	33.2%
Liberal Democrats	Naomi Poore	165	7.5%
UKIP	Eric Bransden	133	6.0%
Green	Andrew Worthley	110	5.0%
Majority		336	15.2%
Turnout		2,214	
Conservative gain from Labour			

=== Polsloe ===
Polsloe
Party	Candidate	Votes	%
Conservative	Yolonda Henson	711	39.3%
Labour	Catherine Dawson	431	23.9%
Liberal Democrats	Laura Newton	382	21.1%
Green	Nicholas Discombe	224	12.4%
UKIP	Graham Stone	59	3.3%
Majority		280	15.5%
Turnout		1,807	
Labour hold			

=== Priory ===
Priory
Party	Candidate	Votes	%
Labour	Lesley Robson	874	42.6%
Conservative	Iris Newby	657	32.0%
Liberal Democrats	Richard Kaye	316	15.4%
Liberal	Nicky Searle	207	10.1%
Majority		217	10.6%
Turnout		2,054	
Labour hold			

=== St Davids ===
St Davids
Party	Candidate	Votes	%
Liberal Democrats	Stella Brock	614	51.7%
Conservative	Percy Prowse	238	20.0%
Labour	Philip Thomas	190	16.0%
Green	Renelda Zanetti	102	8.6%
UKIP	John Parker	44	3.7%
Majority		376	31.6%
Turnout		1,188	
Liberal Democrats hold			

=== Whipton & Barton ===
Whipton & Barton
Party	Candidate	Votes	%
Labour	Peter Edwards	976	46.7%
Conservative	Jeremy White	567	27.1%
Liberal Democrats	Tessa Barrett	302	14.4%
Liberal	Keith Danks	247	11.8%
Majority		409	19.6%
Turnout		2,092	
Labour hold			
