= 2007 Guildford Council election, full results =

These are the 2007 Guildford Council election, full results. A summary of these results can be found at 2007 Guildford Council election.

== Ash South & Tongham ==
Ash South & Tongham (top 3 candidates elected)
Party	Candidate	Votes	%	±%
Conservative	Doug Richards	1393	69.6	
Conservative	Stephen David Winstanley Mansbridge	1377	68.8	
Conservative	Nick Sutcliffe	1354	67.6	
Liberal Democrats	Robert John Benson	538	26.9	
Liberal Democrats	Rebecca Jean White	478	23.9	
Liberal Democrats	Jennifer Joan Harkness	463	23.1	
Majority		816	40.7	
Turnout		2002	33.6	−16.0
Conservative hold		Swing		
Conservative hold		Swing		
Conservative hold		Swing		

== Ash Vale ==
Ash Vale (top 2 candidates elected)
Party	Candidate	Votes	%	±%
Conservative	Nigel Manning	1043	73.8	
Conservative	Marsha Jayne Moseley	1041	73.7	
Liberal Democrats	Janice Marie Clark	346	24.5	
Liberal Democrats	Sue Reardon	327	23.1	
Majority		695	49.2	
Turnout		1413	33.4	−12.0
Conservative hold		Swing		
Conservative hold		Swing		

== Ash Wharf ==
Ash Wharf (top 2 candidates elected)
Party	Candidate	Votes	%	±%
Conservative	Jayne Hewlett	1070	65.2	
Conservative	Pat Scott	989	60.3	
Liberal Democrats	Timothy Melville Peacock	561	34.2	
	Stephen Rainbird	315	19.2	
Majority		428	26.1	
Turnout		1641	35.6	−13.2
Conservative hold		Swing		
Conservative hold		Swing		

== Burpham ==
Burpham (top 2 candidates elected)
Party	Candidate	Votes	%	±%
Liberal Democrats	Ted Mayne	1084	52.0	
Liberal Democrats	Ed Owen	1073	51.4	
Conservative	Nick Brougham	936	44.9	
Conservative	Christian John Holliday	855	41.0	
Labour	Adrian Charles Newton	66	3.2	
Labour	Eileen Mary Balls	57	2.7	
Majority		137	6.5	
Turnout		2086	52.6	−2.9
Liberal Democrats hold		Swing		
Liberal Democrats gain from Conservative		Swing		

== Christchurch ==
Christchurch (top 2 candidates elected)
Party	Candidate	Votes	%	±%
Conservative	Andrew John Edward Hodges	1324	54.8	
Conservative	Matt Furniss	1175	48.6	
Liberal Democrats	Vivienne Natalie Johnson	1101	45.5	
Liberal Democrats	Janet Ann Allan	882	36.5	
Green	John Michael Pletts	125	5.2	
Labour	Malcolm Piers Hill	67	2.8	
Labour	Tim David Wolfenden	49	2.0	
Majority		74	3.1	
Turnout		2418	62.1	−5.5
Conservative hold		Swing		
Conservative gain from Liberal Democrats		Swing		

== Clandon & Horsley ==
Clandon & Horsley (top 3 candidates elected)
Party	Candidate	Votes	%	±%
Conservative	Jennifer Powell	2457	80.1	
Conservative	Andrew French	2421	78.9	
Conservative	Jenny Mary Wicks	2345	76.5	
Liberal Democrats	Ronald James Harman	449	14.6	
Liberal Democrats	Phil Palmer	408	13.3	
Liberal Democrats	Arnold George Pindar	351	11.4	
Labour	Carolyn Fiddes	162	5.3	
Labour	Julie Roxburgh	160	5.2	
Labour	John Virgo Brown	157	5.1	
Majority		1896	61.9	
Turnout		3067	45.2	−13.4
Conservative hold		Swing		
Conservative hold		Swing		
Conservative hold		Swing		

== Effingham ==
Effingham (only 1 candidate elected)
Party	Candidate	Votes	%	±%
Liberal Democrats	Liz Hogger	674	59.1	
Conservative	Ian Charles Frederick Symes	463	40.6	
Majority		211	18.5	
Turnout		1141	56.6	−12.3
Liberal Democrats hold		Swing		

== Friary & St. Nicolas ==
Friary & St. Nicolas (top 3 candidates elected)
Party	Candidate	Votes	%	±%
Liberal Democrats	David John Goodwin	1345	60.8	
Liberal Democrats	Caroline Anne Reeves	1332	60.2	
Liberal Democrats	Anne Mary Meredith	1320	59.7	
Conservative	Elizabeth Ann Hooper	767	34.7	
Conservative	Michael John Gorman	748	33.8	
Conservative	Philip Matthew Simon Hooper	720	32.5	
Labour	Joe Bullock	146	6.6	
Labour	Liz Bullock	130	5.9	
Labour	Norma Hedger	126	5.7	
Majority		553	25.0	
Turnout		unknown		
Liberal Democrats hold		Swing		
Liberal Democrats hold		Swing		
Liberal Democrats hold		Swing		

== Holy Trinity ==
Holy Trinity (top 3 candidates elected)
Party	Candidate	Votes	%	±%
Liberal Democrats	Sarah Di Caprio	1344	51.2	
Conservative	Sarah Kathleen Creedy	1284	48.9	
Liberal Democrats	Michael Crocombe	1274	48.5	
Liberal Democrats	John David Rigg	1247	47.5	
Conservative	Melanie Jane Bright	1168	44.5	
Conservative	Andrew John Colborne-Baber	1115	42.4	
Labour	Barry Hall	103	3.9	
Labour	Alex Ayscough	98	3.7	
Labour	Jane Pallis	91	3.5	
Majority		27	1.0	
Turnout		2627	46.3	−9.5
Liberal Democrats hold		Swing		
Conservative hold		Swing		
Liberal Democrats hold		Swing		

Lovelace (only 1 candidate elected)
Party	Candidate	Votes	%	±%
Conservative	John Richard Garrett	617	68.3	
Liberal Democrats	Elizabeth Victoria Jeffery	184	20.4	
Labour	Robin Clifford Woof	88	9.7	
Majority		433	47.9	
Turnout		904	50.3	−7.2
Conservative hold		Swing		

== Merrow ==
Merrow (top 3 candidates elected)
Party	Candidate	Votes	%	±%
Conservative	Jennifer Jordan	1724	51.6	
Conservative	Sheridan Nicholas Westlake	1707	51.1	
Conservative	David George Carpenter	1705	51.1	
Liberal Democrats	Merilyn Gail Spier	1514	45.3	
Liberal Democrats	Daniel Andrew Jeffery	1393	41.7	
Liberal Democrats	Luigi Di Caprio	1380	41.3	
Labour	Michael Peter Hornsby-Smith	122	3.7	
Labour	Geoffrey Robert Balls	92	2.8	
Labour	Helen Mary Ayscough	91	2.7	
Majority		191	5.8	
Turnout		3339	56.2	−2.0
Conservative hold		Swing		
Conservative hold		Swing		
Conservative gain from Liberal Democrats		Swing		

== Normandy ==
Normandy (only 1 candidate elected)
Party	Candidate	Votes	%	±%
Conservative	Diana Lockyer-Nibbs	828	77.1	
Liberal Democrats	Richard Henry Vincent Charman	238	22.1	
Majority		590	55.0	
Turnout		1074	46.0	−16.2
Conservative hold		Swing		

== Onslow ==
Onslow (top 3 candidates elected)
Party	Candidate	Votes	%	±%
Liberal Democrats	Tony Phillips	1212	53.6	
Liberal Democrats	Steve Freeman	1041	46.0	
Liberal Democrats	Chris Ward	1019	45.0	
Conservative	Sheila Ann Kirkland	853	37.7	
Conservative	Adrian Stuart Chandler	790	34.9	
Conservative	Michael Andrew Chambers	745	32.9	
Independent	Julian Lyon	456	20.2	
Labour	James Heaphy	224	9.9	
Majority		166	7.3	
Turnout		2263	32.4	−9.2
Liberal Democrats hold		Swing		
Liberal Democrats hold		Swing		
Liberal Democrats gain from Conservative		Swing		

== Pilgrims ==
Pilgrims (only 1 candidate elected)
Party	Candidate	Votes	%	±%
Conservative	Tony Rooth	745	83.3	
Liberal Democrats	Philip Scott Mellor	143	16.0	
Majority		602	67.3	
Turnout		894	46.4	−12.0
Conservative hold		Swing		

== Pirbright ==
Pirbright (only 1 candidate elected)
Party	Candidate	Votes	%	±%
Conservative	Mike Nevins	460	66.0	
Liberal Democrats	Bruce McLaren	234	33.6	
Majority		226	32.4	
Turnout		697	35.7	−15.3
Conservative hold		Swing		

== Send ==
Send (top 2 candidates elected)
Party	Candidate	Votes	%	±%
Conservative	Keith Charles Taylor	1135	76.2	
Conservative	Terence Dickson Patrick	1026	68.9	
Liberal Democrats	John Beverley Telfer	318	21.4	
Liberal Democrats	Rupert John Kinnaird Sheard	230	15.4	
Labour	Sheila Bean	107	7.2	
Majority		708	47.5	
Turnout		1489	45.9	−12.4
Conservative hold		Swing		
Conservative hold		Swing		

== Shalford ==
Shalford (top 2 candidates elected)
Party	Candidate	Votes	%	±%
Conservative	Vas Kapsalis	1183	60.2	
Conservative	Neil Ward	1013	51.6	
Liberal Democrats	David Vyvyan Orchard	518	26.4	
Liberal Democrats	David Thomson	420	21.4	
Independent	Mandy Worrall	366	18.6	
Labour	Susan Gomm	83	4.2	
Labour	John Moore	67	3.4	
Majority		495	25.2	
Turnout		1965	47.4	−11.9
Conservative hold		Swing		
Conservative hold		Swing		

== Stoke ==
Stoke (top 2 candidates elected)
Party	Candidate	Votes	%	±%
Liberal Democrats	Melanie Jane Wilberforce	975	52.6	
Liberal Democrats	Alan Muhammed	930	50.2	
Labour	Angela Gunning	517	27.9	
Labour	Michael Joseph Hassell	448	24.2	
Conservative	Gwen Smith	350	18.9	
Conservative	Kenneth Henry Johns	344	18.6	
Majority		413	22.3	
Turnout		1852	41.4	−8.5
Liberal Democrats gain from Labour		Swing		
Liberal Democrats gain from Labour		Swing		

== Stoughton ==
Stoughton (top 3 candidates elected)
Party	Candidate	Votes	%	±%
Liberal Democrats	Wendy May	1557	58.2	
Liberal Democrats	Pauline Ann Searle	1552	58.0	
Liberal Democrats	Gillian Michelle Harwood	1537	57.4	
Conservative	John Hamilton-Williams	951	35.5	
Conservative	Christine Margaret Stacy	925	34.6	
Conservative	David James Quelch	911	34.0	
Labour	William McCulloch Scott	112	4.2	
Labour	Rajanathan Rajasingham	106	4.0	
Labour	Michael Stanley Jeram	103	3.8	
Majority		586	21.9	
Turnout		2677	38.2	−9.0
Liberal Democrats hold		Swing		
Liberal Democrats hold		Swing		
Liberal Democrats hold		Swing		

== Tillingbourne ==
Tillingbourne (top 2 candidates elected)
Party	Candidate	Votes	%	±%
Conservative	David Wright	1371	67.0	
Conservative	Roy Hogben	1307	63.9	
Independent	David Hall	593	29.0	
Liberal Democrats	Clive Wicks	335	16.4	
Labour	Sally Carrol Tiffin	136	6.7	
Labour	Alex Marshall	102	5.0	
Majority		714	34.9	
Turnout		2045	49.7	−12.6
Conservative hold		Swing		
Conservative gain from Independent		Swing		

== Westborough ==
Westborough (top 3 candidates elected)
Party	Candidate	Votes	%	±%
Liberal Democrats	Marilyn Merryweather	1364	59.3	
Liberal Democrats	Olaf Eugen Kolassa	1363	59.2	
Liberal Democrats	Fiona Jean White	1317	57.2	
Conservative	Ralph James Bennett	517	22.5	
Conservative	Lucinda Jane Hill	511	22.2	
Conservative	Rupert Barnaby Miles Alfred Richard Meddings	431	18.7	
Labour	Joan Anne May O'Byrne	308	13.4	
Labour	Carole Jean Barber	279	12.1	
Labour	Martin Phillips	273	11.9	
Peace	John Morris	88	3.8	
Peace	Tom May	65	2.8	
Majority		800	34.7	
Turnout		2302	35.0	−12.0
Liberal Democrats hold		Swing		
Liberal Democrats hold		Swing		
Liberal Democrats hold		Swing		

== Worplesdon ==
Worplesdon (top 3 candidates elected)
Party	Candidate	Votes	%	±%
Liberal Democrats	Jill Margaret Chan	1601	51.0	
Liberal Democrats	Mary Laker	1582	50.4	
Liberal Democrats	Victor John Searle	1557	49.6	
Conservative	Bob McShee	1402	44.6	
Conservative	Sheila Gladys Knight	1389	44.2	
Conservative	Dennis Paul	1352	43.0	
Labour	Brenda Rosemary Hill	78	2.5	
Labour	Peter Paul Newmark	74	2.4	
Labour	Paul Craig Sanderson	74	2.4	
Majority		155	5.0	
Turnout		3141	48.8	−5.6
Liberal Democrats hold		Swing		
Liberal Democrats hold		Swing		
Liberal Democrats hold		Swing		
