= 1999 North Dorset District Council election =

1999 UK local government election

Elections to North Dorset District Council were held on 6 May 1999, alongside other local elections across the United Kingdom. The Liberal Democrats lost the council to no overall control.

== Results summary ==
1999 North Dorset election
Party	Seats before	Seats after	Change
Conservative Party	1	16	▲15
Liberal Democrats	17	10	▼7
Independents	11	6	▼5
Other	4	1	▼3
