= 2015 North Dorset District Council election =

2015 UK local government election

Map of the results of the 2015 North Dorset District Council election. Conservatives in blue, Liberal Democrats in yellow and independents in grey.

The 2015 North Dorset District Council election took place on 7 May 2015 to elect members of North Dorset District Council in England. This was on the same day as other local elections. All 33 seats were up for election, in 19 different wards. The Conservative Party stayed in overall control of the council.

== Election result ==
The Conservatives increased their majority, with a gain of 4 councillors since 2011, at the expense of the number of Liberal Democrat and Independent councillors, who both lost 2 councillors respectively.

Party	Seats	Gains	Lost	Net Gain/Loss
Conservative	27	4	0	+4
Liberal Democrat	4	0	2	-2
Independent	2	0	2	-2
