= 2003 North Dorset District Council election =

Local election in Dorset

Map of North Dorset showing the results of the 2003 local election.

The 2003 election to North Dorset District Council was held on 1 May 2003, alongside other local elections across the United Kingdom. All 33 seats were up for election and the council remained under no overall control.

== Results summary ==
2003 North Dorset election
Party	Seats before	Seats after	Change
Conservative Party	15	15	Steady
Liberal Democrats	11	11	▲2
Other	9	7	▼2

== See also ==
- North Dorset District Council elections
