= 2004 Exeter City Council election =

2004 UK local government election

| ← 2003 | 10 June 2004 | 2006 → |

14 of the 40 seats to Exeter City Council 21 seats needed for a majority
- Turnout: 41.9%
| | First party | Second party |
|---|---|---|
| Party | Labour | Liberal Democrats |
| Last election | 20 | 10 |
| Seats won | 7 | 4 |
| Seats after | 19 | 12 |
| Seat change | ▼1 | ▲2 |
| Popular vote | 8,083 | 7,448 |
| Percentage | 29.4% | 27.1% |
| | Third party | Fourth party |
| Party | Conservative | Liberal |
| Last election | 6 | 4 |
| Seats won | 2 | 1 |
| Seats after | 5 | 4 |
| Seat change | ▼1 | Steady |
| Popular vote | 8,048 | 1,634 |
| Percentage | 29.3% | 6.0% |
- Map showing the results of the 2004 Exeter City Council elections by ward. Red shows Labour seats, blue shows the Conservatives, yellow shows the Liberal Democrats and orange shows the Liberals. Wards in grey had no election.
Council control before election
No overall control
Council control after election
No overall control

The 2004 Exeter City Council election took place on 10 June 2004, to elect members of Exeter City Council in Devon, England. The election was held concurrently with other local elections in England. One third of the council was up for election and the council remained under no overall control.

== Results summary ==
2004 Exeter City Council election
| Party | This election | | | Full council | | | This election | | |
| Party | Seats | Net | Seats % | Other | Total | Total % | Votes | Votes % | +/− |
|---|---|---|---|---|---|---|---|---|---|
| Labour | 7 | ▼1 | 50.0 | 12 | 19 | 47.5 | 8,083 | 29.8 | -2.8 |
| Liberal Democrats | 4 | ▲2 | 28.6 | 8 | 12 | 30.0 | 7,448 | 27.5 | +2.9 |
| Conservative | 2 | ▼1 | 14.3 | 3 | 5 | 12.5 | 8,048 | 29.7 | +2.9 |
| Liberal | 1 | Steady | 7.1 | 3 | 4 | 10.0 | 1,634 | 6.0 | -3.8 |
| Green | 0 | Steady | 0.0 | 0 | 0 | 0.0 | 1,473 | 5.4 | +1.7 |
| UKIP | 0 | Steady | 0.0 | 0 | 0 | 0.0 | 170 | 0.6 | -0.2 |
| Independent | 0 | Steady | 0.0 | 0 | 0 | 0.0 | 124 | 0.5 | -1.0 |
| Democratic Socialist Alliance | 0 | Steady | 0.0 | 0 | 0 | 0.0 | 106 | 0.4 | N/A |

== Ward results ==
=== Alphington ===
Alphington
| Party | Candidate | Votes | % |
|---|---|---|---|
| Liberal Democrats | Michael Browning | 1,627 | 59.2% |
| Conservative | Margaret Jordan | 530 | 19.3% |
| Labour | Celia Morrish | 376 | 13.7% |
| Green | Andrew Bell | 216 | 7.9% |
| Majority | | 1,097 | 39.9% |
| Turnout | | 2,749 | |
| Liberal Democrats hold | | | |

=== Exwick ===
Exwick
| Party | Candidate | Votes | % |
|---|---|---|---|
| Labour | Hazel Slack | 817 | 40.3% |
| UKIP | Lawrence Harper | 363 | 17.9% |
| Liberal Democrats | Rodney Ruffle | 362 | 17.9% |
| Conservative | Daniel Bower | 359 | 17.7% |
| Independent | David Mashiter | 124 | 6.1% |
| Majority | | 454 | 22.4% |
| Turnout | | 2,025 | |
| Labour hold | | | |

=== Newtown ===
Newtown
| Party | Candidate | Votes | % |
|---|---|---|---|
| Labour | Richard Branston | 777 | 50.2% |
| Conservative | Graham Stone | 312 | 20.2% |
| Liberal Democrats | Tommy Leung | 237 | 15.3% |
| Green | Isaac Price-Sosner | 178 | 11.5% |
| Democratic Socialist Alliance | Peter Sloman | 44 | 2.8% |
| Majority | | 465 | 30.0% |
| Turnout | | 1,548 | |
| Labour hold | | | |

=== Pennsylvania ===
Pennsylvania
| Party | Candidate | Votes | % |
|---|---|---|---|
| Liberal Democrats | Paul Pettinger | 865 | 43.3% |
| Conservative | Jeffrey Coates | 737 | 36.9% |
| Labour | Lesley Robson | 240 | 12.0% |
| Green | Suzanne Dunstan | 154 | 7.7% |
| Majority | | 128 | 6.4% |
| Turnout | | 1,996 | |
| Liberal Democrats gain from Conservative | | | |

=== Pinhoe ===
Pinhoe
| Party | Candidate | Votes | % |
|---|---|---|---|
| Labour | Valerie Dixon | 952 | 43.6% |
| Conservative | Ruth Smith | 897 | 41.1% |
| Liberal Democrats | David Barker-Hahlo | 334 | 15.3% |
| Majority | | 55 | 2.5% |
| Turnout | | 2,183 | |
| Labour hold | | | |

=== Polsloe ===
Polsloe
| Party | Candidate | Votes | % |
|---|---|---|---|
| Labour | Rachel Lyons | 591 | 33.8% |
| Conservative | Margaret Baldwin | 554 | 31.7% |
| Liberal Democrats | Nigel Williams | 318 | 18.2% |
| Green | Nicholas Discombe | 284 | 16.3% |
| Majority | | 37 | 2.1% |
| Turnout | | 1,747 | |
| Labour hold | | | |

=== Priory ===
Priory
| Party | Candidate | Votes | % |
|---|---|---|---|
| Labour | Marcel Choules | 932 | 42.5% |
| Conservative | Iris Newby | 618 | 28.2% |
| Liberal | Emma McCord | 324 | 14.8% |
| Liberal Democrats | Pamela Thickett | 317 | 14.5% |
| Majority | | 314 | 14.3% |
| Turnout | | 2,191 | |
| Labour hold | | | |

=== St Davids ===
St Davids
| Party | Candidate | Votes | % |
|---|---|---|---|
| Liberal Democrats | Philip Brock | 754 | 60.7% |
| Labour | Richard Harris | 290 | 23.3% |
| Conservative | Andrew Leadbetter | 199 | 16.0% |
| Majority | | 464 | 37.3% |
| Turnout | | 1,243 | |
| Liberal Democrats hold | | | |

=== St James ===
St James
| Party | Candidate | Votes | % |
|---|---|---|---|
| Labour | Mary Griffiths | 573 | 35.2% |
| Liberal Democrats | Natalie Cole | 457 | 28.1% |
| Conservative | Simon Smith | 370 | 22.7% |
| Green | Adrian Thomas | 229 | 14.1% |
| Majority | | 116 | 7.1% |
| Turnout | | 1,629 | |
| Labour hold | | | |

=== St Leonards ===
St Leonards
| Party | Candidate | Votes | % |
|---|---|---|---|
| Conservative | Norman Shiel | 951 | 49.2% |
| Liberal Democrats | Nigel Gooding | 381 | 19.7% |
| Labour | Eileen Digweed | 375 | 19.4% |
| Green | Louisa Radice | 227 | 11.7% |
| Majority | | 570 | 29.5% |
| Turnout | | 1,934 | |
| Conservative hold | | | |

=== St Loyes ===
St Loyes
| Party | Candidate | Votes | % |
|---|---|---|---|
| Liberal | Joan Morrish | 948 | 60.6% |
| Conservative | Emily Dover | 195 | 12.5% |
| UKIP | David Challice | 170 | 10.9% |
| Labour | Dennis Lewis | 137 | 8.8% |
| Liberal Democrats | Tessa Barrett | 66 | 4.2% |
| Green | Stephen Jones | 49 | 3.1% |
| Majority | | 753 | 48.1% |
| Turnout | | | |
| Liberal hold | | | |

=== St Thomas ===
St Thomas
| Party | Candidate | Votes | % |
|---|---|---|---|
| Liberal Democrats | Rob Hannaford | 915 | 43.4% |
| Labour | Connel Boyle | 774 | 36.7% |
| Conservative | Daniel Thomas | 221 | 10.5% |
| Green | Paul Edwards | 136 | 6.5% |
| Democratic Socialist Alliance | Bruce Chapman | 62 | 2.9% |
| Majority | | 141 | 6.7% |
| Turnout | | 2,108 | |
| Liberal Democrats gain from Labour | | | |

=== Topsham ===
Topsham
| Party | Candidate | Votes | % |
|---|---|---|---|
| Conservative | Mary Evans | 1,560 | 67.2% |
| Liberal Democrats | Sandra Barrett | 475 | 20.4% |
| Labour | Dorothy Parker | 288 | 12.4% |
| Majority | | 1,085 | 46.7% |
| Turnout | | 2,323 | |
| Conservative hold | | | |

=== Whipton & Barton ===
Whipton & Barton
| Party | Candidate | Votes | % |
|---|---|---|---|
| Labour | Kevin Moore | 961 | 43.5% |
| Conservative | Keith Nelson-Tomsen | 545 | 24.7% |
| Liberal | Keith Danks | 362 | 16.4% |
| Liberal Democrats | Polly Osterley | 340 | 15.4% |
| Majority | | 416 | 18.8% |
| Turnout | | 2,208 | |
| Labour hold | | | |

== By-elections ==
=== St. James ===
St. James: 5 May 2005
| Party | Candidate | Votes | % | ±% |
|---|---|---|---|---|
| Liberal Democrats | | 1,171 | 39.6 | +11.5 |
| Labour | | 746 | 25.3 | −9.9 |
| Conservative | | 648 | 21.9 | −0.8 |
| Green | | 389 | 13.2 | −0.9 |
| Majority | | 425 | 14.3 | |
| Turnout | | 2,954 | | |
| Liberal Democrats gain from Labour | | Swing | ▲10.7 | |
