= 2007 Exeter City Council election =

2007 UK local government election

← 2006	3 May 2007	2008 →

13 of the 40 seats to Exeter City Council 21 seats needed for a majority
- Turnout: 37.9%
	First party	Second party
Party	Labour	Liberal Democrats
Last election	16	12
Seats won	3	4
Seats after	14	12
Seat change	▼2	Steady
Popular vote	6,491	6,392
Percentage	27.3%	26.9%
	Third party	Fourth party
Party	Conservative	Liberal
Last election	8	4
Seats won	4	2
Seats after	10	4
Seat change	▲2	Steady
Popular vote	7,138	2,426
Percentage	30.0%	10.2%
- Map showing the results of the 2007 Exeter City Council elections by ward. Red shows Labour seats, blue shows the Conservatives, yellow shows the Liberal Democrats and orange shows the Liberals. Wards in white had no election.
Council control before election
No overall control
Council control after election
No overall control

The 2007 Exeter City Council election took place on 3 May 2007, to elect members to 13 of the 40 seats of Exeter City Council in Devon, England. The election was held concurrently with other local elections in England. One third of the council was up for election and the council remained under no overall control.

== Results summary ==
2007 Exeter City Council election
Party	This election			Full council			This election		
Party	Seats	Net	Seats %	Other	Total	Total %	Votes	Votes %	+/−
Labour	3	▼2	23.1	11	14	35.0	6,483	27.3	-3.0
Liberal Democrats	4	Steady	30.8	8	12	30.0	6,400	26.9	+1.7
Conservative	4	▲2	30.8	6	10	25.0	7,138	30.0	-0.4
Liberal	2	Steady	15.4	2	4	10.0	2,426	10.2	+4.7
Green	0	Steady	0.0	0	0	0.0	882	3.7	-2.7
UKIP	0	Steady	0.0	0	0	0.0	445	1.9	-0.3

== Ward results ==
=== Alphington ===
Alphington
Party	Candidate	Votes	%
Liberal Democrats	Peter Wadham	1,122	46.4%
Conservative	Margaret Jordan	726	30.0%
Labour	Paul Bull	360	14.9%
Green	Andrew Bell	208	8.6%
Majority		396	16.4%
Turnout		2,416	
Liberal Democrats hold			

=== Cowick ===
Cowick
Party	Candidate	Votes	%
Conservative	Jeffrey Coates	638	35.7%
Labour	Allan Hart	599	33.5%
Liberal Democrats	John Holman	427	23.9%
UKIP	David Challice	124	6.9%
Majority		39	2.2%
Turnout		1,788	
Conservative gain from Labour			

=== Duryard ===
Duryard
Party	Candidate	Votes	%
Conservative	Percy Prowse	619	41.5%
Liberal Democrats	Sheila Hobden	618	41.4%
Labour	Daniel Crawford	125	8.4%
Green	Sam Coates	130	8.7%
Majority		1	0.1%
Turnout			1,492
Conservative gain from Liberal Democrats			

=== Exwick ===
Exwick
Party	Candidate	Votes	%
Liberal Democrats	Laura Newton	919	39.0%
Labour	Roy Slack	896	38.0%
Conservative	James Moffat	311	13.2%
UKIP	Lawrence Harper	153	6.5%
Liberal	Janet Gale	78	3.3%
Majority		23	1.0%
Turnout		2,357	
Liberal Democrats gain from Labour			

=== Heavitree ===
Heavitree
Party	Candidate	Votes	%
Liberal	David Morrish	1,100	61.5%
Labour	Philip Thomas	267	14.9%
Conservative	Louis Ten-Holter	231	12.9%
Liberal Democrats	Pamela Thickett	116	6.5%
UKIP	Rodney de Maine	76	4.2%
Majority		833	46.5%
Turnout		1,790	
Liberal hold			

=== Mincinglake & Whipton ===
Mincinglake & Whipton
Party	Candidate	Votes	%
Labour	Dilys Baldwin	633	51.2%
Conservative	Eileen Stockman	364	29.4%
Liberal Democrats	Samuel Strawbridge	240	19.4%
Majority		269	21.7%
Turnout		1,237	
Labour hold			

=== Priory ===
Priory
Party	Candidate	Votes	%
Labour	Gregory Sheldon	897	43.9%
Conservative	David Henson	709	34.7%
Liberal Democrats	Sandra Barrett	315	15.4%
Liberal	Keith Danks	122	6.0%
Majority		188	9.2%
Turnout		2,043	
Labour hold			

=== St James ===
St James
Party	Candidate	Votes	%
Liberal Democrats	Kevin Mitchell	653	45.2%
Labour	Catherine Dawson	384	26.6%
Green	Isaac Price-Sosner	205	14.2%
Conservative	Christian May	203	14.0%
Majority		269	18.6%
Turnout		1,445	
Liberal Democrats hold			

=== St Leonards ===
St Leonards
Party	Candidate	Votes	%
Conservative	John Winterbottom	945	52.2%
Labour	Roger Spackman	396	21.9%
Liberal Democrats	Pamela Holman	242	13.4%
Green	Andrew Worthley	228	12.6%
Majority		549	30.3%
Turnout		1,811	
Conservative hold			

=== St Loyes ===
St Loyes
Party	Candidate	Votes	%
Liberal	Margaret Danks	724	46.4%
Conservative	Harlene Arden	409	26.2%
Labour	George Sterry	220	14.1%
Liberal Democrats	Richard Kaye	117	7.5%
UKIP	Eric Bransden	92	5.9%
Majority		315	20.2%
Turnout		1,562	
Liberal hold			

=== St Thomas ===
St Thomas
Party	Candidate	Votes	%
Liberal Democrats	Adrian Fullam	1,015	57.1%
Labour	Richard Harris	452	25.4%
Conservative	Patricia White	200	11.2%
Green	Richard Timmis	111	6.2%
Majority		563	31.7%
Turnout		1,778	
Liberal Democrats hold			

=== Topsham ===
Topsham
Party	Candidate	Votes	%
Conservative	Rob Newby	1,221	62.7%
Liberal Democrats	Rachel Sutton	367	18.8%
Labour	Christine Fullam	359	18.4%
Majority		854	43.9%
Turnout		1,947	
Conservative hold			

=== Whipton & Barton ===
Whipton & Barton
Party	Candidate	Votes	%
Labour	Hilda Sterry	895	42.5%
Conservative	Jeremy White	562	26.7%
Liberal	Rodney Northcott	402	19.1%
Liberal Democrats	Adrian Stone	249	11.8%
Majority		333	15.8%
Turnout		2,108	
Labour hold			
