= 2007 West Dorset District Council election =

2007 UK local government election

- 3 May 2007

All 48 seats to West Dorset District Council 25 seats needed for a majority
	First party	Second party	Third party
	Con	LD	Ind
Party	Conservative	Liberal Democrats	Independent
Last election	25 seats, 45.5%	12 seats, 30.2%	11 seats, 19.0%
Seats won	26	16	6
Seat change	▲1	▲4	▼5
Popular vote	25,505	20,465	3,822
Percentage	48.2%	38.7%	7.2%
Swing	▲2.7%	▲8.5%	▼11.8%
- Map showing the results of the 2007 West Dorset District Council elections.
Council control before election
Conservative
Council control after election
Conservative

The 2007 West Dorset District Council election was held on Thursday 3 May 2007 to elect councillors to West Dorset District Council in England. It took place on the same day as other district council elections in the United Kingdom. The entire council was up for election.

The 2007 election saw the Conservatives maintain their majority control of the District Council.

== Ward results ==
=== Beaminster ===
Beaminster (2 seats)
Party	Candidate	Votes	%	±%
Liberal Democrats	Caroline Lucy Payne *	813	48.6	N/A
Liberal Democrats	Janet Irene Page	712	–	
Conservative	C. Etherington	705	42.2	N/A
Conservative	R. Knox	704	–	
Independent	M. Garcia	154	9.2	N/A
Turnout			48.8	
Registered electors		3,306		
Liberal Democrats hold				
Liberal Democrats gain from Conservative				

=== Bradford Abbas ===
Bradford Abbas
Party	Candidate	Votes	%	±%
Conservative	W. Mellish	432	47.8	N/A
Liberal Democrats	T. Rogers	419	46.4	+12.5
Green	G. Black	52	5.8	N/A
Majority		13	1.4	N/A
Turnout			59.7	+21.1
Registered electors		1,514		
Conservative gain from Independent		Swing		

=== Bradpole ===
Bradpole
Party	Candidate	Votes	%	±%
Conservative	Ronald William Coatsworth *	474	70.6	–7.9
Liberal Democrats	G. Fifield	134	20.0	–1.5
Green	Julian Jones	63	9.4	N/A
Majority		340	50.7	–6.4
Turnout			40.6	+9.6
Registered electors		1,668		
Conservative hold		Swing		

=== Bridport North ===
Bridport North (2 seats)
Party	Candidate	Votes	%	±%
Conservative	R. Stoodley *	561	31.5	+3.8
Liberal Democrats	Rosamond Catherine Kayes	543	34.2	+6.4
Liberal Democrats	Christopher Martin Ray *	514	–	
Conservative	K. Day	466	–	
Green	N. Judd	173	10.9	N/A
Independent	C. Sparkes	156	9.8	N/A
Labour	R. Nicholls	155	9.8	–13.2
Turnout			40.5	+6.9
Registered electors		3,431		
Conservative hold		Swing		
Liberal Democrats hold		Swing		

=== Bridport South & Bothenhampton ===
Bridport South & Bothenhampton (3 seats)
Party	Candidate	Votes	%	±%
Conservative	Sandra Ann Brown *	1,061	33.2	+3.4
Liberal Democrats	Karl Gareth Wallace	779	24.4	+12.4
Independent	David Robert Tett *	755	23.6	–1.7
Liberal Democrats	Dave Rickard	689	–	
Conservative	D. Wallace	656	–	
Liberal Democrats	J. Hunt	612	–	
Conservative	L. Wallace	547	–	
Green	T. Dickson	391	12.2	+2.6
Labour	L. Begley	211	6.6	–13.1
Turnout			45.5	+7.8
Registered electors		4,720		
Conservative hold		Swing		
Liberal Democrats gain from Conservative		Swing		
Independent hold		Swing		

=== Broadmayne ===
Broadmayne
Party	Candidate	Votes	%	±%
Conservative	Alan John Thacker *	429	65.1	N/A
Liberal Democrats	M. Lane	230	34.9	N/A
Majority		199	30.2	N/A
Turnout			45.8	N/A
Registered electors		1,587		
Conservative gain from Independent				

=== Broadwindsor ===
Broadwindsor
Party	Candidate	Votes	%	±%
Conservative	Jacqualyne Frances Irene Sewell *	474	70.5	+12.1
Liberal Democrats	Teresa Georgina Harrison	198	29.5	–12.1
Majority		276	41.1	+24.2
Turnout			45.3	–0.3
Registered electors		1,493		
Conservative hold		Swing		

=== Burton Bradstock ===
Burton Bradstock
Party	Candidate	Votes	%	±%
Liberal Democrats	M. Parsons *	531	49.3	–17.9
Conservative	J. Cook	482	44.8	+12.0
Green	L. Edwards	64	5.9	N/A
Majority		49	4.5	–29.9
Turnout			64.9	+5.8
Registered electors		1,662		
Liberal Democrats hold		Swing		

=== Cam Vale ===
Cam Vale
Party	Candidate	Votes	%	±%
Liberal Democrats	S. Friar *	407	46.5	–12.6
Conservative	T. Cook	377	43.1	+2.2
Independent	P. Jenkins	91	10.4	N/A
Majority		30	3.4	–14.9
Turnout			52.4	+5.7
Registered electors		1,677		
Liberal Democrats hold		Swing		

=== Charminster & Cerne Valley ===
Charminster & Cerne Valley (2 seats)
Party	Candidate	Votes	%	±%
Conservative	Sarah Jane East *	1,150	59.3	–14.9
Conservative	Andrew Frederick Horsington *	1,131	–	
Liberal Democrats	P. McGuinness	540	27.8	N/A
Labour	L. Ahern	249	12.8	N/A
Turnout			47.4	+6.4
Registered electors		3,626		
Conservative hold		Swing		
Conservative hold		Swing		

=== Charmouth ===
Charmouth
Party	Candidate	Votes	%	±%
Independent	D. Newson *	unopposed	N/A	N/A
Registered electors		1,516		
Independent hold				

=== Chesil Bank ===
Chesil Bank
Party	Candidate	Votes	%	±%
Conservative	Thomas William George Bartlett *	605	66.2	+5.1
Liberal Democrats	D. Gardner	309	33.8	–5.1
Majority		296	32.4	+10.3
Turnout			51.5	+5.9
Registered electors		1,794		
Conservative hold		Swing		

=== Chickerell ===
Chickerell (3 seats)
Party	Candidate	Votes	%	±%
Liberal Democrats	Ian Charles Gardner *	739	45.4	+3.2
Conservative	Elaine Elizabeth Whyte	733	45.0	+6.1
Liberal Democrats	M. Rogers *	672	–	
Liberal Democrats	J. Worth	669	–	
Conservative	Margaret Jean Dunseith	656	–	
Conservative	R. Fleming	654	–	
Labour	T. Gould	156	9.6	N/A
Labour	K. Parish	133	–	
Labour	R. Wyatt	124	–	
Turnout			37.4	+8.8
Registered electors		4,394		
Liberal Democrats hold		Swing		
Conservative hold		Swing		
Liberal Democrats hold		Swing		

=== Chideock & Symondsbury ===
Chideock & Symondsbury
Party	Candidate	Votes	%	±%
Conservative	Gillian Esme Summers *	449	66.4	–1.1
Liberal Democrats	T. Fifield	227	33.6	+1.1
Majority		222	32.8	–2.2
Turnout			45.2	+6.2
Registered electors		1,506		
Conservative hold		Swing		

=== Dorchester East ===
Dorchester East (2 seats)
Party	Candidate	Votes	%	±%
Liberal Democrats	Enid Stella Jones *	838	48.0	–11.1
Liberal Democrats	Timothy Charles Nelson Harries *	659	–	
Conservative	R. Martindale	458	26.2	–14.7
Independent	A. Delgoffe	267	15.3	N/A
Labour	O. Trevett	182	10.4	N/A
Turnout			40.3	+4.3
Registered electors		3,446		
Liberal Democrats hold		Swing		
Liberal Democrats hold		Swing		

=== Dorchester North ===
Dorchester North (2 seats)
Party	Candidate	Votes	%	±%
Liberal Democrats	Andrew James Canning *	726	43.2	+4.4
Liberal Democrats	Susan Caroline Hosford	636	–	
Conservative	A. Beard *	551	32.8	+5.6
Conservative	V. Allan	519	–	
Independent	V. Waddington-Black	404	24.0	N/A
Turnout			43.7	+1.7
Registered electors		3,437		
Liberal Democrats hold		Swing		
Liberal Democrats gain from Independent		Swing		

=== Dorchester South ===
Dorchester South (2 seats)
Party	Candidate	Votes	%	±%
Liberal Democrats	Molly Rennie *	1,007	60.1	+3.0
Liberal Democrats	Robin Potter *	940	–	
Conservative	J. Halewood	668	39.9	–3.0
Conservative	N. Matthews	578	–	
Turnout			49.4	+9.4
Registered electors		3,326		
Liberal Democrats hold		Swing		
Liberal Democrats hold		Swing		

=== Dorchester West ===
Dorchester West (2 seats)
Party	Candidate	Votes	%	±%
Liberal Democrats	David Trevor Jones *	764	37.7	–
Independent	David John Barrett *	755	37.2	–3.3
Liberal Democrats	A. Harries	495	–	
Conservative	J. Cooke	360	17.8	–3.9
Labour	J. Fell	149	7.3	N/A
Turnout			45.2	+3.2
Registered electors		3,408		
Liberal Democrats hold		Swing		
Independent hold		Swing		

=== Frome Valley ===
Frome Valley
Party	Candidate	Votes	%	±%
Conservative	Naomi Mary Penfold *	711	80.1	N/A
Liberal Democrats	S. Morris	177	19.9	N/A
Majority		534	60.1	N/A
Turnout			50.9	N/A
Registered electors		1,771		
Conservative gain from Independent				

=== Halstock ===
Halstock
Party	Candidate	Votes	%	±%
Independent	T. Frost *	unopposed	N/A	N/A
Registered electors		1,527		
Independent hold				

=== Loders ===
Loders
Party	Candidate	Votes	%	±%
Conservative	Mark Brandon Roberts *	441	66.3	+16.2
Liberal Democrats	M. Ray	224	33.7	+12.7
Majority		217	32.6	+11.4
Turnout			46.3	+4.9
Registered electors		1,451		
Conservative hold		Swing		

=== Lyme Regis ===
Lyme Regis (2 seats)
Party	Candidate	Votes	%	±%
Liberal Democrats	Daryl Whane Turner	769	39.9	N/A
Independent	Patrick William James Hicks	591	–	
Conservative	Owen Keith Lovell *	568	29.5	–17.5
Conservative	K. Meech *	420	–	
Independent	S. Williams	283	–	
Turnout			47.8	+14.5
Registered electors		3,129		
Liberal Democrats hold		Swing		
Independent gain from Independent		Swing		

=== Maiden Newton ===
Maiden Newton
Party	Candidate	Votes	%	±%
Conservative	N. Patmore *	unopposed	N/A	N/A
Registered electors		1,600		
Conservative gain from Independent				

=== Marshwood Vale ===
Marshwood Vale
Party	Candidate	Votes	%	±%
Conservative	Michael Disney Robinson	451	62.0	+11.2
Liberal Democrats	L. Thomas	277	38.0	–11.2
Majority		174	23.9	+22.3
Turnout			50.8	–5.0
Registered electors		1,437		
Conservative hold		Swing		

=== Netherbury ===
Netherbury
Party	Candidate	Votes	%	±%
Conservative	Anthony Paul Robin Alford *	395	67.4	+5.3
Liberal Democrats	J. Wymer	191	32.6	–5.3
Majority		204	34.8	+10.7
Turnout			35.2	–7.8
Registered electors		1,676		
Conservative hold		Swing		

=== Owermoigne ===
Owermoigne (2 seats)
Party	Candidate	Votes	%	±%
Conservative	P. Read	818	55.5	+3.0
Conservative	Teresa Mary Seall *	770	–	
Liberal Democrats	D. Burden	467	31.7	N/A
Liberal Democrats	R. Armstrong	441	–	
Labour	G. Napper	190	12.9	N/A
Labour	W. Napper	177	–	
Turnout			50.5	+8.0
Registered electors		2,924		
Conservative hold		Swing		
Conservative hold		Swing		

=== Piddle Valley ===
Piddle Valley
Party	Candidate	Votes	%	±%
Conservative	N. Barker *	644	85.0	N/A
Liberal Democrats	C. Savory	114	15.0	N/A
Majority		530	69.9	N/A
Turnout			46.2	N/A
Registered electors		1,659		
Conservative hold		Swing		

=== Puddletown ===
Puddletown
Party	Candidate	Votes	%	±%
Conservative	Robert Patrick Gordon Cooke *	unopposed	N/A	N/A
Registered electors		1,839		
Conservative gain from Independent				

=== Queen Thorne ===
Queen Thorne
Party	Candidate	Votes	%	±%
Conservative	Robert Andrew Gould *	599	81.5	N/A
Liberal Democrats	J. Jones	136	18.5	N/A
Majority		463	63.0	N/A
Turnout			45.0	N/A
Registered electors		1,634		
Conservative hold				

=== Sherborne East ===
Sherborne East (2 seats)
Party	Candidate	Votes	%	±%
Conservative	Terence Peter Farmer *	813	46.8	+3.1
Conservative	Dominic Charles Elliot	789	–	
Green	Jenny Susan Greene	441	25.4	–7.1
Liberal Democrats	C. Gloster	295	17.0	N/A
Liberal Democrats	J. McGuinness	286	–	
Labour	Graham Parish	188	10.8	–13.1
Turnout			42.5	+8.5
Registered electors		3,544		
Conservative hold		Swing		
Conservative hold		Swing		

=== Sherborne West ===
Sherborne West (2 seats)
Party	Candidate	Votes	%	±%
Conservative	Peter Robert Shorland *	926	64.8	+8.4
Conservative	Marjorie Snowden *	878	–	
Liberal Democrats	S. Friar	503	35.2	–8.4
Liberal Democrats	S. Hewson	459	–	
Turnout			42.2	+8.6
Registered electors		3,464		
Conservative hold		Swing		
Conservative hold		Swing		

=== Winterborne St Martin ===
Winterborne St Martin
Party	Candidate	Votes	%	±%
Independent	Stephen John Slade *	unopposed	N/A	N/A
Registered electors		1,678		
Independent hold				

=== Yetminster ===
Yetminster
Party	Candidate	Votes	%	±%
Conservative	Margaret Rose Lawrence	402	55.1	–14.7
Liberal Democrats	Josephine Jones	327	44.9	+14.7
Majority		75	10.7	–28.9
Turnout			53.4	+12.1
Registered electors		1,371		
Conservative hold		Swing		
