= 2007 Stroud District Council election =

Results of the 2007 Stroud District Council election

The 2007 Stroud Council election took place on 3 May 2007 to elect members of Stroud District Council in Gloucestershire, England. One third of the council was up for election and the Conservative Party stayed in overall control of the council.

After the election, the composition of the council was

- Conservative 31
- Labour 9
- Green 5
- Liberal Democrat 4
- Independent 2

== Election result ==
The results saw the Conservatives stay in control of the council after making a net gain of 2 seats to hold 31 of the 51 seats. The Conservatives gained Farmhill and Paganhill from an independent, Dursley and Upton St Leonards from the Liberal Democrats and Cam East from the Labour Party. However Labour gained Cainscross back from the Conservatives, while the Liberal Democrats defeated the Conservative cabinet member Nigel Cooper in Rodborough by 5 votes. Meanwhile, the Greens held all 4 seats they had been defending and came within 12 votes of taking Nailsworth from the Conservatives. Overall turnout in the election was 41.17%.

Stroud local election result 2007
Party	Seats	Gains	Losses	Net gain/loss	Seats %	Votes %	Votes	+/−
Conservative	9	4	2	+2	47.4	40.4	10,106	-7.0%
Green	4	0	0	0	21.1	18.9	4,724	+6.7%
Labour	3	1	1	0	15.8	23.1	5,774	+2.0%
Liberal Democrats	2	1	2	-1	10.5	13.5	3,383	-3.5%
Independent	1	0	1	-1	5.3	2.3	572	+0.0%
UKIP	0	0	0	0	0	1.7	434	+1.7%

== Ward results ==
Berkeley
Party	Candidate	Votes	%	±%
Conservative	Tim Archer	913	69.9	−8.9
Labour	John Greenwood	394	30.1	+4.2
Majority		519	39.7	+4.6
Turnout		1,307	39.9	−1.0
Conservative hold		Swing		

Cainscross
Party	Candidate	Votes	%	±%
Labour	Mark Rees	953	49.3	
Conservative	Norma Rodman	672	34.8	
Green	Helen Royall	307	15.9	
Majority		281	14.5	
Turnout		1,932	36.5	+1.2
Labour gain from Conservative		Swing		

Cam East
Party	Candidate	Votes	%	±%
Conservative	Brian Tipper	723	47.9	−2.0
Labour	Miranda Clifton	575	38.1	+8.8
Liberal Democrats	Patrick Blitz	211	14.0	−6.8
Majority		148	9.8	−10.8
Turnout		1509	46.1	+3.7
Conservative gain from Labour		Swing		

Cam West
Party	Candidate	Votes	%	±%
Labour	John Fowles	482	39.3	+16.4
Liberal Democrats	Veronica Collins	402	32.8	−21.1
Conservative	Mike Howard	343	28.0	+4.8
Majority		80	6.5	
Turnout		1,227	38.0	+1.3
Labour hold		Swing		

Central
Party	Candidate	Votes	%	±%
Conservative	Mike Williams	245	41.9	−4.6
Green	Molly Scott Cato	193	33.0	+10.0
Labour	Miranda Williams	100	17.1	−1.3
Liberal Democrats	Andrew Fisk	47	8.0	−4.0
Majority		52	8.9	−14.6
Turnout		585	40.2	+1.2
Conservative hold		Swing		

Chalford
Party	Candidate	Votes	%	±%
Conservative	Liz Peters	1,114	55.3	+1.0
Green	Kate Shuckburgh	492	24.4	+2.3
Labour	Dorothy Nichols	250	12.4	+1.5
UKIP	Leslie Banstead	158	7.8	+7.8
Majority		622	30.9	−1.3
Turnout		2,014	40.4	−1.4
Conservative hold		Swing		

Dursley
Party	Candidate	Votes	%	±%
Conservative	Loraine Patrick	653	34.5	−8.1
Labour	Geoffrey Wheeler	639	33.7	+0.4
Liberal Democrats	Brian Marsh	603	31.8	+7.7
Majority		14	0.7	−8.5
Turnout		1,895	40.9	−2.0
Conservative gain from Liberal Democrats		Swing		

Farmhill and Paganhill
Party	Candidate	Votes	%	±%
Conservative	Henry Carr	268	45.2	+32.0
Independent	Roger Sanders	202	34.1	−27.7
Labour	Lesley Williams	123	20.7	+3.4
Majority		66	11.1	
Turnout		593	35.6	+1.7
Conservative gain from Independent		Swing		

Minchinhampton
Party	Candidate	Votes	%	±%
Conservative	Libby Bird	1,071	63.2	+10.2
Liberal Democrats	Colleen Rothwell	226	13.3	−0.4
Labour	John Appleton	206	12.2	−5.4
Green	Marie Gwynn	191	11.3	+3.0
Majority		845	49.9	+14.5
Turnout		1,694	49.1	+13.7
Conservative hold		Swing		

Nailsworth
Party	Candidate	Votes	%	±%
Conservative	John Jeffreys	839	38.4	−0.8
Green	Chris Harmer	827	37.9	+1.9
Labour	Jo Smith	290	13.3	−0.8
UKIP	Adrian Blake	116	5.3	+5.3
Liberal Democrats	Adrian Walker-Smith	112	5.1	−5.6
Majority		12	0.5	−2.6
Turnout		2,184	43.8	−2.3
Conservative hold		Swing		

Rodborough
Party	Candidate	Votes	%	±%
Liberal Democrats	Christine Headley	479	30.8	+23.1
Conservative	Nigel Cooper	474	30.4	−0.5
Green	Philip Blomberg	406	26.1	−0.6
Labour	Sally Thorpe	198	12.7	−4.0
Majority		5	0.4	
Turnout		1,557	44.7	
Liberal Democrats gain from Conservative		Swing		

Slade
Party	Candidate	Votes	%	±%
Green	Gwen Belcher	299	59.0	+10.7
Conservative	Laurence Ward-Toye	125	24.7	−3.7
Labour	Ela Pathak-Sen	83	16.4	−7.0
Majority		174	34.3	+14.4
Turnout		507	32.1	+1.0
Green hold		Swing		

Stonehouse
Party	Candidate	Votes	%	±%
Labour	Chris Brine	854	41.3	−1.7
Conservative	Phil Bevan	765	37.0	+0.4
Green	Clare Sheridan	287	13.9	+0.4
UKIP	Stephen Burt	160	7.7	+7.7
Majority		89	4.3	−2.0
Turnout		2,066	35.6	+1.3
Labour hold		Swing		

Thrupp
Party	Candidate	Votes	%	±%
Green	Martin Whiteside	536	62.6	+12.2
Conservative	Daniel Le Fleming	234	27.3	−3.9
Labour	Ron Nichols	45	5.3	−6.6
Liberal Democrats	Sylvia Bridgeland	41	4.8	−1.7
Majority		302	35.3	+16.1
Turnout		856	47.1	−0.8
Green hold		Swing		

Trinity
Party	Candidate	Votes	%	±%
Green	John Marjoram	450	62.3	+8.8
Conservative	Jason Bullingham	147	20.4	−2.9
Labour	Malcolm Perry	75	10.4	−5.3
Liberal Democrats	Doug Janke	50	6.9	−0.6
Majority		303	42.0	+11.9
Turnout		722	44.8	+0.1
Green hold		Swing		

Uplands
Party	Candidate	Votes	%	±%
Independent	Linda Townley	370	62.6	+21.8
Conservative	Jenefer Wythe	119	20.1	−5.8
Labour	Jamila Gavin	102	17.3	+0.9
Majority		251	42.5	+27.6
Turnout		591	34.9	−1.8
Independent hold		Swing		

Upton St Leonards
Party	Candidate	Votes	%	±%
Conservative	Keith Pearson	670	78.5	+39.5
Labour	David Smith	184	21.5	+11.9
Majority		486	57.0	
Turnout		854	47.6	
Conservative gain from Liberal Democrats		Swing		

Valley
Party	Candidate	Votes	%	±%
Green	Sarah Lunnon	340	58.9	+10.3
Conservative	Ian Edmunds	148	25.6	−0.9
Labour	Patricia Leonard	89	15.4	+0.2
Majority		192	33.3	+11.2
Turnout		577	35.8	
Green hold		Swing		

Wotton-Under-Edge
Party	Candidate	Votes	%	±%
Liberal Democrats	Paul Smith	1,212	52.2	+12.4
Conservative	Linda Jeffreys	583	25.1	−16.0
Green	Clive Phillips	396	17.0	+6.9
Labour	Daryl Matthews	132	5.7	−3.4
Majority		629	27.1	
Turnout		2,323	45.9	+1.5
Liberal Democrats hold		Swing		
