= 2007 North Dorset District Council election =

Local election in Dorset

Map of North Dorset showing the results of the 2007 local election.

Elections to North Dorset District Council were held on 3 May 2007, alongside other local elections across the United Kingdom. All 33 seats were up for election. The Conservative Party gained the council from no overall control.

== Results summary ==
2007 North Dorset election
Party	Seats before	Seats after	Change
Conservative Party	15	17	▲2
Liberal Democrats	13	13	Steady
Other	5	3	▼2

== See also ==
- North Dorset District Council elections
