= 2007 Colchester Borough Council election =

2007 English local government election

- 3 May 2007

20 out of 60 seats to Colchester Borough Council 31 seats needed for a majority
- Turnout: 34.7% (▼1.7%)
| | First party | Second party |
|---|---|---|
| Party | Conservative | Liberal Democrats |
| Last election | 30 seats, 38.9% | 21 seats, 34.8% |
| Seats before | 30 | 21 |
| Seats won | 9 | 7 |
| Seats after | 30 | 21 |
| Seat change | Steady | Steady |
| Popular vote | 14,342 | 10,052 |
| Percentage | 41.8% | 29.3% |
| Swing | ▲2.9% | ▼4.5% |
| | Third party | Fourth party |
| Party | Labour | Independent |
| Last election | 7 seats, 13.3% | 2 seats, 5.5% |
| Seats before | 7 | 2 |
| Seats won | 3 | 1 |
| Seats after | 6 | 3 |
| Seat change | ▼1 | ▲1 |
| Popular vote | 5,581 | 1,052 |
| Percentage | 16.3% | 3.1% |
| Swing | ▲3.0% | ▼2.4% |
- Winner of each seat at the 2007 Colchester Borough Council election.
Council control before election
No overall control
Council control after election
No overall control

The 2007 Colchester Borough Council election took place on 3 May 2007 to elect members of Colchester Borough Council in Essex, England. One third of the council was up for election and the council stayed under no overall control.

== Campaign ==
Before the election the Conservatives had 30 of the 60 seats on the council, while the Liberal Democrats had 21, Labour had 7 and there were 2 independents.

With the Conservative Party needing to gain one seat to gain a majority on the council for the first time since 1986, Colchester attracted national attention with the Shadow Foreign Secretary, William Hague, coming to the marginal Shrub End ward to campaign for the Conservatives. Meanwhile, one of the Green Party's Principal Speakers Siân Berry came to Colchester and campaigned on the importance of public transport, with the Greens contesting every seat at the election.

== Summary ==
=== Election result ===
The Conservatives narrowly failed to gain a majority on the council after failing to take Wivenhoe Quay from Labour by two votes after two recounts. This meant the Conservatives remained on 30 councillors, while the Liberal Democrats stayed on 21 seats. Labour's loss of Shrub End to the Conservatives meant they dropped to 6 councillors, while the Greens failed to win any seats despite getting 32% of the vote in Castle ward. Overall turnout at the election was 34.7%.

2007 Colchester Borough Council election
| Party | This election | | | | Full council | | | This election | | |
| Party | Candidates | Seats | Net | Seats % | Other | Total | Total % | Votes | Votes % | +/− |
|---|---|---|---|---|---|---|---|---|---|---|
| Conservative | 20 | 9 | Steady | 45.0 | 21 | 30 | 50.0 | 14,342 | 41.8 | +2.9 |
| Liberal Democrats | 20 | 7 | Steady | 35.0 | 14 | 21 | 35.0 | 10,052 | 29.3 | –4.5 |
| Labour | 20 | 3 | ▼1 | 15.0 | 3 | 6 | 10.0 | 5,581 | 16.3 | +3.0 |
| Independent | 1 | 1 | ▲1 | 5.0 | 2 | 3 | 5.0 | 1,052 | 3.1 | –2.4 |
| Green | 20 | 0 | Steady | 0.0 | 0 | 0 | 0.0 | 3,267 | 9.5 | +1.0 |

== Ward results ==
=== Berechurch ===
Berechurch
| Party | Candidate | Votes | % | ±% |
|---|---|---|---|---|
| Labour | Dave Harris* | 931 | 49.7 | +17.4 |
| Liberal Democrats | Keith Hindle | 483 | 25.8 | −16.4 |
| Conservative | Claire Bright | 352 | 18.8 | +0.7 |
| Green | Philippa Lane | 109 | 5.8 | −1.6 |
| Majority | | 448 | 23.9 | N/A |
| Turnout | | 1,875 | 32.7 | −1.3 |
| Registered electors | | 5,740 | | |
| Labour hold | | Swing | ▲16.9 | |

=== Birch & Winstree ===
Birch & Winstree
| Party | Candidate | Votes | % | ±% |
|---|---|---|---|---|
| Conservative | Peter Crowe* | 1,164 | 70.1 | +3.5 |
| Liberal Democrats | Jonathan Longman | 313 | 18.9 | +1.2 |
| Labour | James Spencer | 100 | 6.0 | −1.0 |
| Green | Tobie Glenny | 83 | 5.0 | −0.9 |
| Majority | | 851 | 51.3 | +2.4 |
| Turnout | | 1,660 | 37.5 | −4.6 |
| Registered electors | | 4,438 | | |
| Conservative hold | | Swing | ▲1.2 | |

=== Castle ===
Castle
| Party | Candidate | Votes | % | ±% |
|---|---|---|---|---|
| Liberal Democrats | Nick Barlow | 940 | 41.0 | −7.7 |
| Green | Peter Lynn | 740 | 32.3 | +9.7 |
| Conservative | Glenn Granger | 469 | 20.5 | +2.4 |
| Labour | Michael Powell | 142 | 6.2 | −1.9 |
| Majority | | 200 | 8.7 | −17.3 |
| Turnout | | 2,291 | 37.4 | −4.1 |
| Registered electors | | 6,182 | | |
| Liberal Democrats hold | | Swing | ▼8.7 | |

=== Christ Church ===
Christ Church
| Party | Candidate | Votes | % | ±% |
|---|---|---|---|---|
| Liberal Democrats | Martin Hunt* | 588 | 42.4 | −1.3 |
| Conservative | Andrew Bright | 474 | 34.2 | +0.9 |
| Green | Alexander Cave | 245 | 17.7 | +0.3 |
| Labour | David Canning | 79 | 5.7 | +0.1 |
| Majority | | 114 | 8.2 | −2.2 |
| Turnout | | 1,386 | 46.0 | −2.3 |
| Registered electors | | 3,018 | | |
| Liberal Democrats hold | | Swing | ▼1.1 | |

=== Copford & West Stanway ===
Copford & West Stanway
| Party | Candidate | Votes | % | ±% |
|---|---|---|---|---|
| Conservative | Jackie Maclean | 394 | 69.1 | −1.4 |
| Liberal Democrats | Sue Waite | 82 | 14.4 | +7.0 |
| Labour | Ian Spademan | 48 | 8.4 | +0.4 |
| Green | Sophie Lovejoy | 46 | 8.1 | +8.1 |
| Majority | | 312 | 54.7 | −1.8 |
| Turnout | | 570 | 38.4 | +4.4 |
| Registered electors | | 1,494 | | |
| Conservative hold | | Swing | ▼4.2 | |

=== Fordham & Stour ===
Fordham & Stour
| Party | Candidate | Votes | % | ±% |
|---|---|---|---|---|
| Conservative | Nigel Chapman* | 913 | 67.2 | +0.6 |
| Liberal Democrats | David Shakespeare | 180 | 13.2 | +0.8 |
| Green | Mervyn Carter | 146 | 10.7 | +2.6 |
| Labour | Jo Aldous | 120 | 8.8 | +0.4 |
| Majority | | 733 | 53.9 | −0.3 |
| Turnout | | 1,359 | 34.3 | −2.4 |
| Registered electors | | 3,983 | | |
| Conservative hold | | Swing | ▼0.1 | |

=== Great Tey ===
Great Tey
| Party | Candidate | Votes | % | ±% |
|---|---|---|---|---|
| Conservative | Peter Chillingworth* | 670 | 71.9 | +3.3 |
| Liberal Democrats | Carolyn Catney | 105 | 11.3 | −9.6 |
| Labour | John Wood | 90 | 9.7 | −1.8 |
| Green | Paul Goldsmith | 67 | 7.2 | −7.2 |
| Majority | | 565 | 60.6 | +12.8 |
| Turnout | | 932 | 41.9 | −0.8 |
| Registered electors | | 2,226 | | |
| Conservative hold | | Swing | ▲6.5 | |

=== Highwoods ===
Highwoods
| Party | Candidate | Votes | % | ±% |
|---|---|---|---|---|
| Independent | Philip Oxford | 1,052 | 52.6 | −5.6 |
| Conservative | Simon Lucas | 427 | 21.4 | +6.5 |
| Liberal Democrats | John Baker | 306 | 15.3 | +0.1 |
| Labour | Janet Smith | 127 | 6.4 | −1.1 |
| Green | Gary Kittle | 88 | 4.4 | +0.1 |
| Majority | | 625 | 31.3 | −11.7 |
| Turnout | | 2,000 | 30.9 | −1.7 |
| Registered electors | | 6,484 | | |
| Independent gain from Conservative | | Swing | ▼6.1 | |

=== Mile End ===
Mile End
| Party | Candidate | Votes | % | ±% |
|---|---|---|---|---|
| Liberal Democrats | Anne Turrell* | 1,081 | 47.1 | +8.2 |
| Conservative | Marianne Anderson | 995 | 43.4 | −2.8 |
| Labour | Steve Crawshaw | 118 | 5.1 | −1.1 |
| Green | Mary Bryan | 99 | 4.3 | −2.1 |
| Majority | | 86 | 3.8 | N/A |
| Turnout | | 2,293 | 39.5 | +1.0 |
| Registered electors | | 5,812 | | |
| Liberal Democrats hold | | Swing | ▲5.5 | |

=== New Town ===
New Town
| Party | Candidate | Votes | % | ±% |
|---|---|---|---|---|
| Liberal Democrats | Margaret Fisher* | 872 | 55.6 | −9.8 |
| Conservative | George Askew | 271 | 17.3 | N/A |
| Green | Linda Wonnacott | 252 | 16.1 | −5.4 |
| Labour | Luke Dopson | 173 | 11.0 | −2.1 |
| Majority | | 601 | 38.3 | −5.5 |
| Turnout | | 1,568 | 27.0 | −1.8 |
| Registered electors | | 5,867 | | |
| Liberal Democrats hold | | Swing | N/A | |

=== Prettygate ===
Prettygate
| Party | Candidate | Votes | % | ±% |
|---|---|---|---|---|
| Conservative | Wyn Foster | 1,404 | 54.2 | +0.6 |
| Liberal Democrats | Paul Ost | 875 | 33.8 | −0.9 |
| Labour | Michael Dale | 182 | 7.0 | −0.3 |
| Green | Peter Appleton | 129 | 5.0 | +0.5 |
| Majority | | 529 | 20.4 | +1.5 |
| Turnout | | 2,590 | 43.7 | +0.0 |
| Registered electors | | 5,958 | | |
| Conservative gain from Liberal Democrats | | Swing | ▲0.8 | |

=== St. Andrew's ===
St. Andrew's
| Party | Candidate | Votes | % | ±% |
|---|---|---|---|---|
| Labour | Tim Young* | 969 | 61.6 | −8.2 |
| Liberal Democrats | Rebecca Price | 299 | 19.0 | −10.2 |
| Conservative | Alex Wilson | 237 | 15.1 | +2.7 |
| Green | Andrew Senter | 68 | 4.3 | −0.7 |
| Majority | | 670 | 42.6 | +18.4 |
| Turnout | | 1,573 | 24.8 | −3.4 |
| Registered electors | | 6,363 | | |
| Labour hold | | Swing | ▲1.0 | |

=== St. Anne's ===
St. Anne's
| Party | Candidate | Votes | % | ±% |
|---|---|---|---|---|
| Liberal Democrats | Barrie Cook* | 1,000 | 49.3 | −2.5 |
| Labour | Kim Naish | 548 | 27.0 | +0.6 |
| Conservative | Anne Allan | 368 | 18.2 | +4.5 |
| Green | Annick Collins-Leyssen | 111 | 5.5 | −2.5 |
| Majority | | 452 | 22.3 | −3.1 |
| Turnout | | 2,027 | 32.2 | −0.5 |
| Registered electors | | 6,336 | | |
| Liberal Democrats hold | | Swing | ▼1.6 | |

=== Shrub End ===
Shrub End
| Party | Candidate | Votes | % | ±% |
|---|---|---|---|---|
| Conservative | Pauline Hazell | 718 | 38.5 | +4.8 |
| Liberal Democrats | Nigel Offen | 643 | 34.5 | −7.5 |
| Labour | Richard Bourne* | 404 | 21.7 | +2.1 |
| Green | Walter Schwarz | 100 | 5.4 | +0.6 |
| Majority | | 75 | 4.0 | N/A |
| Turnout | | 1,865 | 31.2 | −1.6 |
| Registered electors | | 6,008 | | |
| Conservative gain from Labour | | Swing | ▲6.2 | |

=== Stanway ===
Stanway
| Party | Candidate | Votes | % | ±% |
|---|---|---|---|---|
| Liberal Democrats | Lesley Scott-Boutell* | 1,214 | 52.2 | +10.2 |
| Conservative | Beverly Davies | 897 | 38.6 | −5.4 |
| Labour | John Spademan | 141 | 6.1 | −2.4 |
| Green | Pam Nelson | 74 | 3.2 | −2.3 |
| Majority | | 317 | 13.6 | N/A |
| Turnout | | 2,326 | 37.7 | −0.5 |
| Registered electors | | 6,166 | | |
| Liberal Democrats hold | | Swing | ▲7.8 | |

=== Tiptree ===
Tiptree
| Party | Candidate | Votes | % | ±% |
|---|---|---|---|---|
| Conservative | Margaret Crowe* | 1,185 | 65.4 | +11.0 |
| Labour | Audrey Spencer | 330 | 18.2 | +3.6 |
| Liberal Democrats | Michael Turrell | 151 | 8.3 | −1.4 |
| Green | Katherine Bamforth | 146 | 8.1 | +2.0 |
| Majority | | 855 | 47.2 | +7.9 |
| Turnout | | 1,812 | 30.2 | −0.2 |
| Registered electors | | 6,008 | | |
| Conservative hold | | Swing | ▲3.7 | |

=== West Bergholt & Eight Ash Green ===
West Bergholt & Eight Ash Green
| Party | Candidate | Votes | % | ±% |
|---|---|---|---|---|
| Conservative | Jill Todd* | 877 | 62.9 | −0.7 |
| Liberal Democrats | Barry Woodward | 177 | 12.7 | −4.8 |
| Labour | Abigail Tootal | 173 | 12.4 | +4.5 |
| Green | Roger Bamforth | 167 | 12.0 | +1.1 |
| Majority | | 700 | 50.2 | +4.1 |
| Turnout | | 1,394 | 36.4 | −1.8 |
| Registered electors | | 3,849 | | |
| Conservative hold | | Swing | ▲2.1 | |

=== West Mersea ===
West Mersea
| Party | Candidate | Votes | % | ±% |
|---|---|---|---|---|
| Conservative | Margaret Kimberley* | 1,510 | 74.1 | +3.6 |
| Liberal Democrats | Christopher Butler | 201 | 9.9 | +9.9 |
| Labour | Barbara Nichols | 178 | 8.7 | −1.4 |
| Green | Beverley Maltby | 148 | 7.3 | −3.2 |
| Majority | | 1,309 | 64.3 | +4.2 |
| Turnout | | 2,037 | 35.0 | +0.2 |
| Registered electors | | 5,837 | | |
| Conservative hold | | Swing | ▼3.2 | |

=== Wivenhoe Cross ===
Wivenhoe Cross
| Party | Candidate | Votes | % | ±% |
|---|---|---|---|---|
| Liberal Democrats | Mark Cory | 395 | 42.5 | +3.2 |
| Conservative | David Adams* | 371 | 39.9 | −6.5 |
| Green | Maria Iacovou | 83 | 8.9 | +8.9 |
| Labour | Rossanna Trudgian | 80 | 8.6 | −5.7 |
| Majority | | 24 | 2.6 | −4.5 |
| Turnout | | 929 | 27.3 | +0.1 |
| Registered electors | | 3,428 | | |
| Liberal Democrats gain from Conservative | | Swing | ▲5.0 | |

=== Wivenhoe Quay ===
Wivenhoe Quay
| Party | Candidate | Votes | % | ±% |
|---|---|---|---|---|
| Labour | Stephen Ford* | 648 | 35.9 | +17.2 |
| Conservative | Penny Kraft | 646 | 35.7 | −0.9 |
| Green | Chris Fox | 366 | 20.3 | N/A |
| Liberal Democrats | Sharon Humphrey | 147 | 8.1 | −8.9 |
| Majority | | 2 | 0.1 | N/A |
| Turnout | | 1,807 | 44.4 | +0.7 |
| Registered electors | | 4,125 | | |
| Labour hold | | Swing | ▲9.1 | |
