= 2007 Tewkesbury Borough Council election =

Tewkesbury Borough Council election

Results of the 2007 Tewkesbury Borough Council election

The 2007 Tewkesbury Borough Council election took place on 3 May 2007 to elect members of Tewkesbury Borough Council in England. This was on the same day as other local elections. The council remained in No Overall Control, with the Conservatives winning exactly half of the seats. The Labour Party was wiped out on the council.

== Election results ==
2007 Tewkesbury Borough Council election
Party	Seats	Gains	Losses	Net gain/loss	Seats %	Votes %	Votes	+/−
Conservative	19	5	3	▲2	50.0	44.6	12,201	+1.6
Liberal Democrats	17	8	1	▲7	44.7	34.8	9,527	+6.7
Independent	0	0	1	▼1	0.0	7.9	2,162	+1.8
TTI	2	0	2	▼2	5.3	6.3	1,729	-1.2
Labour	0	0	3	▼3	0.0	5.3	1,455	-5.7
Green	0	0	0	Steady	0.0	1.0	283	+0.2

== Ward results ==
=== Ashchurch with Walton Cardiff ===
Ashchurch with Walton Cardiff Ward (2 Councillors)
Party	Candidate	Votes	%	±%
Conservative	Adam Tugwell	494	47.1	+20.4
Conservative	Noel Greaves	447	42.6	+20.0
Liberal Democrats	Cait Clucas*	439	41.8	+1.9
Liberal Democrats	Christine Lochhead	330	31.5	−3.6
Tewkesbury Independents	Philip Workman*	261	24.9	−11.0
Majority		8	0.8	
Turnout		1,049	40.08	
Conservative gain from Liberal Democrats		Swing		
Conservative gain from Tewkesbury Independents		Swing		

=== Badgeworth ===
Badgeworth Ward (1 Councillor)
Party	Candidate	Votes	%	±%
Conservative	Robert Vines*	506	72.2	+5.3
Liberal Democrats	Jane Attwood	195	27.8	−5.3
Majority		311	44.4	
Turnout		704	39.86	
Conservative hold		Swing		

=== Brockworth ===
Brockworth Ward (3 Councillors)
Party	Candidate	Votes	%	±%
Liberal Democrats	Maureen Rowcliffe-Quarry*	947	56.2	N/A
Liberal Democrats	Clair Patey	597	35.5	N/A
Liberal Democrats	Mike Collins	588	34.9	N/A
Independent	Godfrey Browning*	577	34.3	−9.9
Conservative	David Hunt	507	30.1	+11.0
Conservative	Ron Furolo*	482	28.6	+13.0
Independent	Sonia Lefeuvre-Wellard	382	22.7	N/A
Conservative	Robin Lovelass	360	21.4	+8.4
Green	Robert Rendell	208	12.4	+3.1
Majority		11	0.6	
Turnout		1,684	34.10	
Liberal Democrats gain from Brockworth Residents Group		Swing		
Liberal Democrats gain from Brockworth Residents Group		Swing		
Liberal Democrats gain from Brockworth Residents Group		Swing		

=== Churchdown Brookfield ===
Churchdown Brookfield Ward (2 Councillors)
Party	Candidate	Votes	%	±%
Liberal Democrats	Richard Smith*	751	43.5	−10.7
Liberal Democrats	Loraine Yates	727	42.1	−4.7
Independent	Brian Jones*	688	39.8	−10.4
Independent	Alison White	388	22.5	N/A
Conservative	Anna Hay	336	19.4	−30.8
Conservative	Dick Bishop	313	18.1	−21.3
Labour	Kelvin Tustin	93	5.4	N/A
Labour	Sarah Dhillon	70	4.1	N/A
Majority		39	2.3	
Turnout		1,728	52.02	
Liberal Democrats hold		Swing		
Liberal Democrats gain from Conservative		Swing		

=== Churchdown St John's ===
Churchdown St John's Ward (3 Councillors)
Party	Candidate	Votes	%	±%
Liberal Democrats	Pearl Stokes*	1,149	50.8	+6.5
Liberal Democrats	Kay Berry	1,133	50.1	+5.8
Liberal Democrats	Audrey Ricks*	1,074	47.5	+12.4
Conservative	Colin Baker	914	40.4	+5.5
Conservative	Simon Probert	859	38.0	+7.4
Conservative	Greg Ching	856	37.9	+9.8
Labour	Royston Ansley	170	7.5	−15.1
Labour	Keir Dhillon	168	7.4	−14.2
Majority		160	7.1	
Turnout		2,261	43.69	
Liberal Democrats hold		Swing		
Liberal Democrats hold		Swing		
Liberal Democrats hold		Swing		

=== Cleeve Grange ===
Cleeve Grange Ward (1 Councillor)
Party	Candidate	Votes	%	±%
Liberal Democrats	Susan Hillier-Richardson*	491	69.2	+7.0
Conservative	Dave Shurmer	182	25.6	−6.0
Labour	Jayne Stephens	37	5.2	−1.0
Majority		309	43.6	
Turnout		710	44.13	
Liberal Democrats hold		Swing		

=== Cleeve Hill ===
Cleeve Hill Ward (2 Councillors)
Party	Candidate	Votes	%	±%
Conservative	Ken Leech*	1,012	70.9	+7.2
Conservative	Margaret Ogden*	972	68.1	+15.5
Liberal Democrats	Alastair Mason	516	36.1	−11.6
Liberal Democrats	James Habgood	459	32.1	N/A
Labour	David Hilton	76	5.2	N/A
Majority		456	32.0	
Turnout		1,428	45.46	
Conservative hold		Swing		
Conservative hold		Swing		

=== Cleeve St Michael's ===
Cleeve St Michael's Ward (2 Councillors)
Party	Candidate	Votes	%	±%
Liberal Democrats	Philip Taylor	772	53.1	+11.5
Liberal Democrats	Jack Richardson	744	51.2	+31.5
Conservative	Robert East*	602	41.4	−24.5
Conservative	Michael Beresford*	548	37.7	−18.2
Majority		142	9.8	
Turnout		1,454	47.16	
Liberal Democrats gain from Conservative		Swing		
Liberal Democrats gain from Conservative		Swing		

=== Cleeve West ===
Cleeve West Ward (2 Councillors)
Party	Candidate	Votes	%	±%
Liberal Democrats	Tony MacKinnon*	703	62.6	+0.3
Liberal Democrats	Peter Richmond*	659	58.7	−5.7
Conservative	Jenny Cooper	413	36.8	+6.9
Conservative	Roger Wilson	302	26.9	+5.1
Majority		246	21.9	
Turnout		1,123	33.80	
Liberal Democrats hold		Swing		
Liberal Democrats hold		Swing		

=== Coombe Hill ===
Coombe Hill Ward (2 Councillors)
Party	Candidate	Votes	%	±%
Conservative	Mark Williams*	838	61.1	+3.0
Conservative	David Waters	812	59.2	+4.5
Liberal Democrats	Lynn Gough	450	32.8	+5.8
Liberal Democrats	Peter Gough	412	30.0	N/A
Majority		362	26.4	
Turnout		1,372	37.67	
Conservative hold		Swing		
Conservative hold		Swing		

=== Highnam with Haw Bridge ===
Highnam with Haw Bridge Ward (2 Councillors)
Party	Candidate	Votes	%	±%
Conservative	Philip Awford*	1,135	66.2	+12.2
Conservative	Derek Davies*	1,092	63.7	+7.0
Liberal Democrats	Pat Duggan	423	24.7	−14.4
Liberal Democrats	Brian Duggan	392	22.9	−15.2
Labour	Cherry Burrow	156	9.1	N/A
Majority		669	39.0	
Turnout		1,714	48.01	
Conservative hold		Swing		
Conservative hold		Swing		

=== Hucclecote ===
Hucclecote Ward (1 Councillor)
Party	Candidate	Votes	%	±%
Liberal Democrats	Peter Brazil*	347	63.3	+2.5
Conservative	Haydn Pearl	201	36.7	+20.4
Majority		146	26.6	
Turnout		548	44.41	
Liberal Democrats hold		Swing		

=== Innsworth with Down Hatherley ===
Innsworth with Down Hatherley Ward (1 Councillor)
Party	Candidate	Votes	%	±%
Liberal Democrats	Bill Whelan	344	47.4	−0.7
Conservative	Roger Fox	211	29.1	−22.8
Independent	Paul Ockelton*	171	23.6	−28.3
Majority		133	18.3	
Turnout		729	42.19	
Liberal Democrats gain from Conservative		Swing		

=== Isbourne ===
Isbourne Ward (1 Councillor)
Party	Candidate	Votes	%	±%
Conservative	John Evetts*	627	79.3	+8.7
Liberal Democrats	Penny Butler	164	20.7	N/A
Majority		463	58.6	
Turnout		792	47.43	
Conservative gain from Independent		Swing		

=== Northway ===
Northway Ward (2 Councillors)
Party	Candidate	Votes	%	±%
Liberal Democrats	Cynan Clucas	438	42.6	N/A
Liberal Democrats	Richard Hart	336	32.7	N/A
Labour	Margaret Levett*	284	27.7	−26.6
Conservative	Graham Dawson	246	24.0	−10.3
Conservative	Symon Silvester	246	24.0	−3.3
Independent	David Oughton	216	21.0	N/A
Labour	Barry McDonald	178	17.3	−18.8
Majority		52	5.0	
Turnout		1,027	27.25	
Liberal Democrats gain from Labour		Swing		
Liberal Democrats gain from Labour		Swing		

=== Oxenton Hill ===
Oxenton Hill (1 Councillor)
Party	Candidate	Votes	%	±%
Conservative	Allen Keyte*	448	80.7	−7.9
Liberal Democrats	Gavin Olney	107	19.3	+7.9
Majority		341	61.4	
Turnout		556	45.35	
Conservative hold		Swing		

=== Shurdington ===
Shurdington (1 Councillor)
Party	Candidate	Votes	%	±%
Conservative	Philip Surman*	367	59.1	−13.4
Liberal Democrats	June Field	254	40.9	N/A
Majority		113	18.2	
Turnout		627	40.64	
Conservative hold		Swing		

=== Tewkesbury Newtown ===
Tewkesbury Newtown (1 Councillor)
Party	Candidate	Votes	%	±%
Tewkesbury Independents	John McCloy*	478	61.9	-16.7
Conservative	Peter Aldridge	253	32.8	+11.4
Liberal Democrats	Michael Dray	41	5.3	N/A
Majority		225	29.1	
Turnout		775	48.59	
Tewkesbury Independents hold		Swing		

=== Tewkesbury Prior's Park ===
Tewkesbury Prior's Park Ward (2 Councillors)
Party	Candidate	Votes	%	±%
Conservative	Brian Calway*	549	55.5	+20.5
Conservative	Claire Wright	487	49.2	+17.2
Labour	Joan Sklenar*	263	26.6	−11.8
Tewkesbury Independents	Geoff Pope	192	19.4	+10.0
Labour	Stuart Emmerson	147	14.8	−11.3
Liberal Democrats	Avril Hart	109	11.0	+2.4
Liberal Democrats	Stephen Woodrow	96	9.7	N/A
Majority		224	22.6	
Turnout		990	32.43	
Conservative gain from Labour		Swing		
Conservative hold		Swing		

=== Tewkesbury Town with Mitton ===
Tewkesbury Town with Mitton Ward (2 Councillors)
Party	Candidate	Votes	%	±%
Tewkesbury Independents	Michael Sztymiak*	798	54.8	-10.4
Conservative	Elaine Hancox	582	40.1	+18.2
Independent	John Badham	510	35.1	N/A
Tewkesbury Independents	Barbara Cromwell*	502	34.5	−22.6
Conservative	Geoff Sandles	140	9.6	−8.3
Liberal Democrats	Marie Armour	83	5.7	−12.8
Green	Carol Pediani	75	5.2	N/A
Liberal Democrats	Lynn Richmond	40	2.7	N/A
Majority		418	35.2	
Turnout		1,455	43.03	
Tewkesbury Independents hold		Swing		
Conservative gain from Tewkesbury Independents		Swing		

=== Twyning ===
Twyning (1 Councillor)
Party	Candidate	Votes	%	±%
Conservative	Gordon Shurmer*	460	72.3	+8.6
Liberal Democrats	Richard Bailey	176	27.7	N/A
Majority		284	44.6	
Turnout		642	46.02	
Conservative hold		Swing		

=== Winchcombe ===
Winchcombe Ward (3 Councillors)
Party	Candidate	Votes	%	±%
Conservative	Jim Mason*	1,318	58.6	+1.1
Conservative	Ron Allen*	1,298	57.7	−6.1
Conservative	Janet Day*	1,228	54.6	−5.7
Liberal Democrats	Kevin Guyll	628	27.9	+4.2
Liberal Democrats	Michael Dineen	567	25.2	N/A
Labour	Susan Sturgeon	376	16.7	−1.2
Liberal Democrats	Christopher Shervey	334	14.8	N/A
Labour	Robert Trafford	216	9.6	−9.6
Labour	Eileen Greaves	199	8.8	−8.3
Majority		656	33.8	
Turnout		2,250	44.71	
Conservative hold		Swing		
Conservative hold		Swing		
Conservative hold		Swing		
