= 2007 King's Lynn and West Norfolk Borough Council election =

2007 English local election

2007 King's Lynn & West Norfolk Borough Council election
- 3 May 2007

All 62 seats to King's Lynn & West Norfolk Borough Council 32 seats needed for a majority
- Registered: 113,916
- Turnout: 26.1% (▼20.7%)

	First party	Second party
Party	Conservative	Labour
Seats won	54	4
Seat change	▲17	▼10
Popular vote	29,787	9,364
Percentage	61.0%	19.2%
Swing	▲10.6%	▼5.7%
	Third party	Fourth party
Party	Liberal Democrats	Independent
Seats won	4	2
Seat change	▼3	▼4
Popular vote	5,641	1,509
Percentage	11.6%	3.1%
Swing	▼1.9%	▼8.1%
Control before election
Conservative
Control after election
Conservative

The 2007 King's Lynn & West Norfolk Borough Council election took place on 3 May 2007 to elect members of King's Lynn & West Norfolk Borough Council in Norfolk, England. This was on the same day as other local elections.

== Summary ==
=== Election result ===
2007 King's Lynn & West Norfolk Borough Council election
Party	Candidates	Seats	Gains	Losses	Net gain/loss	Seats %	Votes %	Votes	+/−
Conservative	61	54	18	1	▲17	84.4	61.0	29,787	+10.6
Labour	27	4	0	10	▼10	6.3	19.2	9,364	–5.7
Liberal Democrats	15	4	1	4	▼3	6.3	11.6	5,641	–1.9
Independent	3	2	1	5	▼4	3.1	3.1	1,509	–8.1
UKIP	3	0	0	0	Steady	0.0	2.1	1,020	N/A
BNP	2	0	0	0	Steady	0.0	1.5	742	N/A
New Party	1	0	0	0	Steady	0.0	1.0	480	N/A
Green	3	0	0	0	Steady	0.0	0.6	273	N/A

17 Conservative and 1 Liberal Democrat candidate were elected unopposed.

== Ward results ==
Incumbent councillors standing for re-election are marked with an asterisk (*). Changes in seats do not take into account by-elections or defections.

=== Airfield ===
Airfield (2 seats)
Party	Candidate	Votes	%	±%
Conservative	Hugh Symington*	Unopposed		
Conservative	Geoffrey Hipperson*	Unopposed		
Registered electors		3,479		
Conservative hold				
Conservative hold				

=== Brancaster ===
Brancaster
Party	Candidate	Votes	%	±%
Conservative	Tom de Winton	Unopposed		
Registered electors		1,752		
Conservative hold				

=== Burnham ===
Burnham
Party	Candidate	Votes	%	±%
Conservative	Garry Sandell*	564	78.4	
Liberal Democrats	James Cocker	155	21.6	
Majority		409	56.8	
Turnout		719	41.7	
Registered electors		1,732		
Conservative hold		Swing		

=== Clenchwarton ===
Clenchwarton
Party	Candidate	Votes	%	±%
Conservative	Rod Payn	459	53.4	
Liberal Democrats	Kevin Pell	400	46.6	
Majority		59	6.8	
Turnout		859	48.9	
Registered electors		1,755		
Conservative gain from Liberal Democrats		Swing		

=== Denton ===
Denton (3 seats)
Party	Candidate	Votes	%	±%
Conservative	Martin Storey*	1,133	64.1	
Conservative	Adrian Lawrence	1,037	58.7	
Conservative	Mick Peake*	1,000	56.6	
UKIP	David Bick	454	25.7	
Liberal Democrats	Paul Coulten	420	23.8	
Turnout		~1,768	33.2	
Registered electors		5,326		
Conservative hold				
Conservative hold				
Conservative hold				

=== Dersingham ===
Dersingham (2 seats)
Party	Candidate	Votes	%	±%
Liberal Democrats	Paul Burall*	942	55.0	
Conservative	Roy Johnston	855	49.9	
Liberal Democrats	Gillian Sergeant	733	42.8	
Conservative	Mark Lapping	619	36.1	
Turnout		~1,714	43.2	
Registered electors		3,968		
Liberal Democrats hold				
Conservative gain from Liberal Democrats				

=== Docking ===
Docking
Party	Candidate	Votes	%	±%
Conservative	Nick Ullswater*	Unopposed		
Registered electors		1,717		
Conservative hold				

=== Downham Old Town ===
Downham Old Town
Party	Candidate	Votes	%	±%
Conservative	Kathy Mellish*	441	71.9	
Labour	Peter Smith	163	26.6	
Majority		278	45.3	
Turnout		613	34.8	
Registered electors		1,762		
Conservative hold		Swing		

=== East Downham ===
East Downham
Party	Candidate	Votes	%	±%
Conservative	Tony Lovett*	Unopposed		
Registered electors		2,029		
Conservative hold				

=== Emneth with Outwell ===
Emneth with Outwell (2 seats)
Party	Candidate	Votes	%	±%
Conservative	Harry Humphrey*	Unopposed		
Conservative	Chris Crofts	Unopposed		
Registered electors		3,715		
Conservative hold				
Conservative hold				

=== Fairstead ===
Fairstead (2 seats)
Party	Candidate	Votes	%	±%
Labour	Margaret Wilkinson*	506	53.8	
Labour	Ian Gourlay*	459	48.8	
Conservative	Carolyn Taylor	435	46.2	
Conservative	Daryle Taylor	412	43.7	
Turnout		~1,003	25.0	
Registered electors		3,977		
Labour hold				
Labour hold				

=== Gayton ===
Gayton
Party	Candidate	Votes	%	±%
Conservative	Alistair Beales	618	80.1	
Labour	James Moriarty	154	19.9	
Majority		464	60.2	
Turnout		772	42.4	
Registered electors		1,831		
Conservative hold		Swing		

=== Gaywood Chase ===
Gaywood Chase (2 seats)
Party	Candidate	Votes	%	±%
Conservative	Ivan Goodson	541	46.0	
Conservative	Derrick Murphy	474	40.3	
Labour	Christopher Bunting	443	37.7	
Labour	John Collop	398	33.8	
UKIP	Michael Stone	192	16.3	
Turnout		~1,123	29.8	
Registered electors		3,769		
Conservative gain from Labour				
Conservative gain from Labour				

=== Gaywood North Bank ===
Gaywood North Bank (3 seats)
Party	Candidate	Votes	%	±%
Conservative	Michael Langwade*	1,149	54.4	
Conservative	Mark Shorting*	1,144	54.2	
Conservative	Clifford Walters	1,054	49.9	
Labour	Vernon Moyse	646	30.6	
Labour	Laurence Scott	607	28.7	
Labour	Peter Wilkinson	524	24.8	
Turnout		~1,894	32.3	
Registered electors		5,864		
Conservative hold				
Conservative hold				
Conservative gain from Labour				

=== Grimston ===
Grimston
Party	Candidate	Votes	%	±%
Conservative	Michael Pitcher	380	45.8	
Liberal Democrats	Hazel Fredericks*	363	43.8	
Green	Andrew de Whalley	86	10.4	
Majority		17	2.0	
Turnout		829	43.6	
Registered electors		1,908		
Conservative gain from Liberal Democrats		Swing		

=== Heacham ===
Heacham (2 seats)
Party	Candidate	Votes	%	±%
Conservative	Steff Smeaton	1,024	55.7	
Conservative	Andrew Morrison	993	54.0	
Independent	Peter Mallam	516	28.1	
Labour	Irene Macdonald	397	21.6	
Turnout		~1,837	41.6	
Registered electors		4,055		
Conservative gain from Independent				
Conservative gain from Independent				

=== Hilgay with Denver ===
Hilgay with Denver
Party	Candidate	Votes	%	±%
Conservative	Tony White*	Unopposed		
Registered electors		1,895		
Conservative hold				

=== Hunstanton ===
Hunstanton (3 seats)
Party	Candidate	Votes	%	±%
Conservative	Jason Law	1,399	57.4	
Conservative	Richard Searle	1,378	56.6	
Conservative	Liz Watson	1,273	52.3	
Labour	Brian Devlin	560	23.0	
New Party	Alan Booth*	480	19.7	
Labour	Alice Macdonald	415	17.1	
Turnout		~2,247	41.7	
Registered electors		5,049		
Conservative hold				
Conservative hold				
Conservative hold				

=== Mershe Lande ===
Mershe Lande
Party	Candidate	Votes	%	±%
Independent	David Markinson	396	46.5	
Conservative	Jonathan Johns	265	31.1	
Labour	Jack Bantoft*	190	22.3	
Majority		131	15.4	
Turnout		851	42.8	
Registered electors		2,044		
Independent gain from Labour		Swing		

=== North Downham ===
North Downham
Party	Candidate	Votes	%	±%
Conservative	Geoffrey Wareham*	Unopposed		
Registered electors		1,487		
Conservative hold				

=== North Lynn ===
North Lynn (2 seats)
Party	Candidate	Votes	%	±%
Labour	David Collis	436	41.1	
Labour	Andrew Tyler*	422	39.8	
BNP	David Fleming	377	35.5	
BNP	Christine Kelly	365	34.4	
Conservative	Maxine Tweed	294	27.7	
Conservative	Paul Tweed	265	25.0	
Turnout		~1,063	26.9	
Registered electors		4,262		
Labour hold				
Labour hold				

=== North Wootton ===
North Wootton
Party	Candidate	Votes	%	±%
Conservative	Greville Howard*	545	69.3	
Liberal Democrats	Kate Sayer	241	30.7	
Majority		304	38.6	
Turnout		786	40.7	
Registered electors		1,933		
Conservative hold		Swing		

=== Old Gaywood ===
Old Gaywood
Party	Candidate	Votes	%	±%
Conservative	Bill Daws	255	56.4	
Labour	Sandra Collop	197	43.6	
Majority		58	12.8	
Turnout		452	29.1	
Registered electors		1,573		
Conservative gain from Labour		Swing		

=== Priory ===
Priory
Party	Candidate	Votes	%	±%
Conservative	Janet Murphy	465	56.4	
Labour	Gwyneth Thorneywork*	270	32.8	
Green	Nigel Walker	89	10.8	
Majority		195	23.6	
Turnout		824	43.5	
Registered electors		1,908		
Conservative gain from Labour		Swing		

=== Rudham ===
Rudham
Party	Candidate	Votes	%	±%
Conservative	Michael Chenery of Horsburgh	Unopposed		
Registered electors		1,950		
Conservative hold				

=== Snettisham ===
Snettisham (2 seats)
Party	Candidate	Votes	%	±%
Conservative	David Johnson*	1,080	55.1	
Conservative	Zipha Christopher	1,005	51.3	
Labour	Richard Pennington	358	18.3	
Turnout		~1,438	44.0	
Registered electors		3,449		
Conservative gain from Independent				
Conservative gain from Independent				

=== South & West Lynn ===
South & West Lynn (2 seats)
Party	Candidate	Votes	%	±%
Conservative	Geoffrey Daniell*	403	45.1	
Conservative	Peter Lagoda	345	38.6	
Labour	Charles Joyce*	293	32.8	
Labour	Antony Luckett	260	29.1	
Liberal Democrats	Sheila James	197	22.1	
Liberal Democrats	Ian Swinton	147	16.5	
Turnout		~1,301	29.1	
Registered electors		3,052		
Conservative hold				
Conservative gain from Labour				

=== South Downham ===
South Downham
Party	Candidate	Votes	%	±%
Conservative	John Legg*	Unopposed		
Registered electors		1,983		
Conservative hold				

=== South Wootton ===
South Wootton (2 seats)
Party	Candidate	Votes	%	±%
Conservative	Nick Daubney*	Unopposed		
Conservative	Elizabeth Nockolds*	Unopposed		
Registered electors		3,391		
Conservative hold				
Conservative hold				

=== Spellowfields ===
Spellowfields (2 seats)
Party	Candidate	Votes	%	±%
Conservative	David Harwood*	910	70.9	
Conservative	Brian Long*	657	51.2	
UKIP	Delia Hall	374	29.1	
Turnout		~1,207	32.7	
Registered electors		3,692		
Conservative hold				
Conservative hold				

=== Springwood ===
Springwood
Party	Candidate	Votes	%	±%
Liberal Democrats	John Loveless*	297	49.3	
Conservative	Elizabeth Barclay	250	41.5	
Labour	Steve Everett	55	9.1	
Majority		47	7.8	
Turnout		602	37.1	
Registered electors		1,625		
Liberal Democrats hold		Swing		

=== St. Lawrence ===
St. Lawrence
Party	Candidate	Votes	%	±%
Conservative	Barry Ayres*	504	72.8	
Labour	Frank Lewis	188	27.2	
Majority		316	45.7	
Turnout		692	36.1	
Registered electors		1,937		
Conservative hold		Swing		

=== St. Margarets with St. Nicholas ===
St. Margarets with St. Nicholas (2 seats)
Party	Candidate	Votes	%	±%
Conservative	Lesley Bambridge	595	56.8	
Conservative	Jean Mickleburgh	529	50.5	
Labour	Dawn Everitt	453	43.2	
Labour	Alexandra Kemp	423	40.3	
Turnout		~1,104	31.0	
Registered electors		3,562		
Conservative gain from Labour				
Conservative gain from Labour				

=== Upwell & Delph ===
Upwell & Delph (2 seats)
Party	Candidate	Votes	%	±%
Conservative	Vivienne Spikings*	Unopposed		
Conservative	David Pope*	Unopposed		
Registered electors		3,738		
Conservative hold				
Conservative hold				

=== Valley Hill ===
Valley Hill
Party	Candidate	Votes	%	±%
Independent	Mike Tilbury*	597	66.6	
Conservative	Nick Irving	299	33.4	
Majority		298	33.3	
Turnout		896	48.5	
Registered electors		1,849		
Independent hold		Swing		

=== Walpole ===
Walpole
Party	Candidate	Votes	%	±%
Liberal Democrats	Ann Clery-Fox*	Unopposed		
Registered electors		1,745		
Liberal Democrats hold				

=== Walton ===
Walton
Party	Candidate	Votes	%	±%
Conservative	Roy Groom*	Unopposed		
Registered electors		2,071		
Conservative gain from Independent				

=== Watlington ===
Watlington
Party	Candidate	Votes	%	±%
Liberal Democrats	Ian Mack	515	63.7	
Conservative	Sue Miller	293	36.3	
Majority		222	27.4	
Turnout		808	48.3	
Registered electors		1,676		
Liberal Democrats gain from Conservative		Swing		

=== West Winch ===
West Winch (2 seats)
Party	Candidate	Votes	%	±%
Conservative	David Rye*	898	53.0	
Conservative	Christine Rye	835	49.3	
Liberal Democrats	Judith Brown*	657	38.7	
Liberal Democrats	Colin Sayer	348	20.5	
Labour	Linda Everitt	142	8.4	
Labour	Donna Watts	118	7.0	
Turnout		~1,569	40.2	
Registered electors		3,903		
Conservative hold				
Conservative gain from Liberal Democrats				

=== Wiggenhall ===
Wiggenhall
Party	Candidate	Votes	%	±%
Conservative	Francis Moreau	326	53.2	
Labour	Lawrence Wilkinson*	287	46.8	
Majority		39	6.4	
Turnout		613	37.0	
Registered electors		1,670		
Conservative gain from Labour		Swing		

=== Wimbotsham with Fincham ===
Wimbotsham with Fincham
Party	Candidate	Votes	%	±%
Conservative	Trevor Manley	Unopposed		
Registered electors		2,000		
Conservative hold				

=== Wissey ===
Wissey
Party	Candidate	Votes	%	±%
Conservative	Colin Sampson	387	54.4	
Liberal Democrats	John Nicholas-Letch	226	31.8	
Green	Andrew Smith	98	13.8	
Majority		161	22.6	
Turnout		711	38.9	
Registered electors		1,833		
Conservative hold		Swing		
