= 2007 Guildford Borough Council election =

2007 UK local government election

The 2007 council elections in Guildford took place on 3 May 2007 and saw the Conservatives retain control over Guildford Borough Council. Full results for each ward can be found at Guildford Council election, full results, 2007.

== Summary ==
Going into the 2007 council election the net position was as follows. (The net position shown includes the gain by the Liberal Democrats of one seat from the Conservatives during the 2003–07 term, in the Merrow by-election of July 2003.)

Prior to 2007 council election
Party	Seats
Conservative	25
Labour	2
Liberal Democrats	20
Independent	1

After the election the position was as follows.

After 2007 council election
Party	Seats
Conservative	26
Labour	0
Liberal Democrats	22
Independent	0

A more detailed analysis can pick out the following features

- voter turnout fell in every ward in Guildford compared to the 2003 council election;
- the 2007 council election saw a decline in the Labour vote in Guildford and the loss of the last two Labour councillors on Guildford BC;
- additionally the sole Independent councillor did not seek reelection, leaving only Conservatives and Liberal Democrats elected to Guildford BC;
- overall the Liberal Democrats increased their net number of seats by two, gaining four and losing two;
- overall the Conservatives gained one net seat, gaining three and losing two;
- going into the election 6 electoral wards were split (i.e. they were wards where there were 2 or 3 councillors, and those councillors didn't all belong to the same political party). After the election only one ward was split – Holy Trinity;
- geographically the Conservatives hold most of the wards in the villages around Guildford, whereas the Liberal Democrats hold most of the wards in the town itself, in particular towards the north and west of Guildford town;
- geographically the 2007 election saw Conservatives pick up their seats towards the south east of Guildford. The Liberal Democrats picked up their seats towards the north and west of Guildford town.

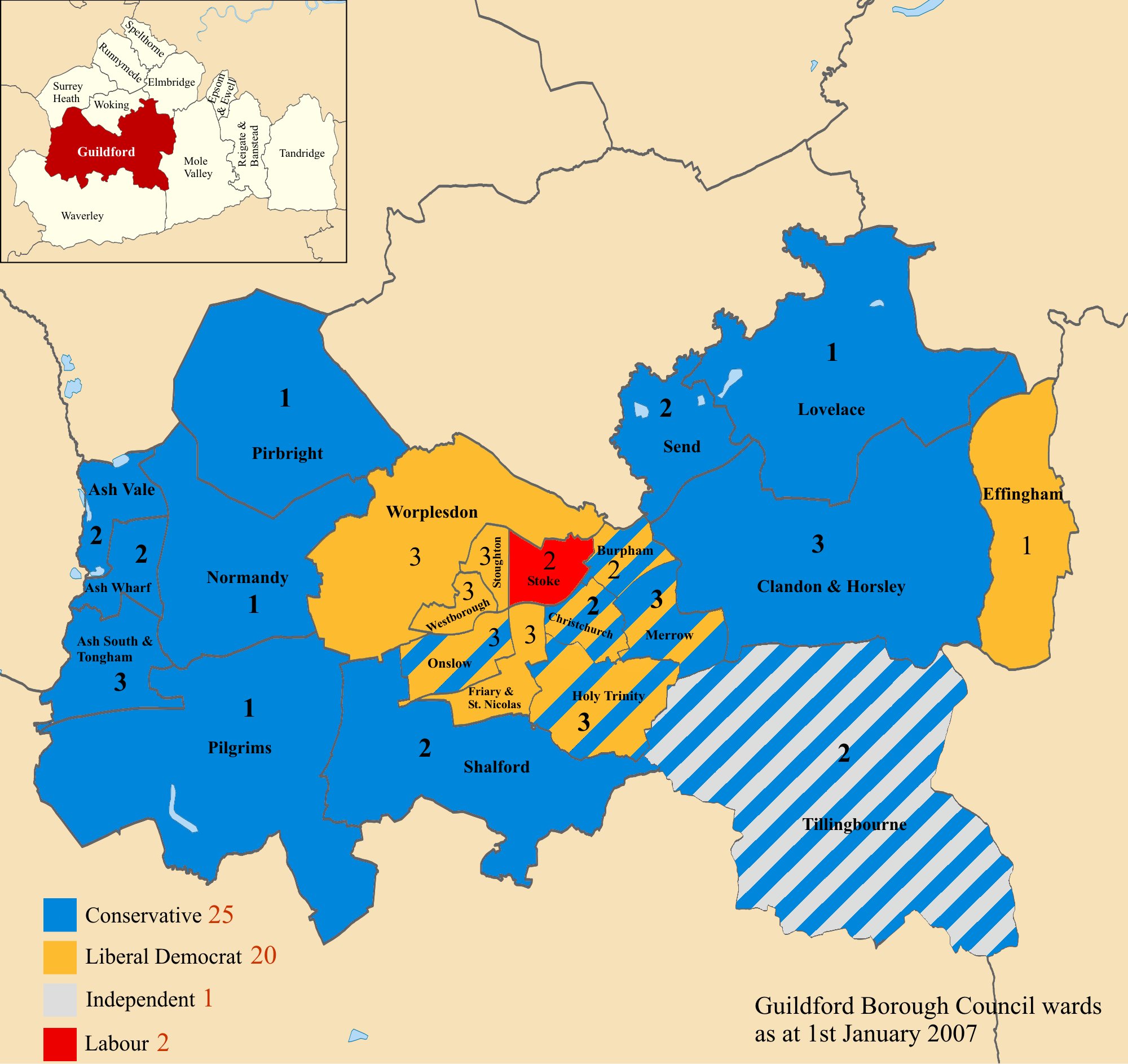
The first electoral map shows the position going into the election. The numbers in each ward refer to the number of councillors that ward elects.

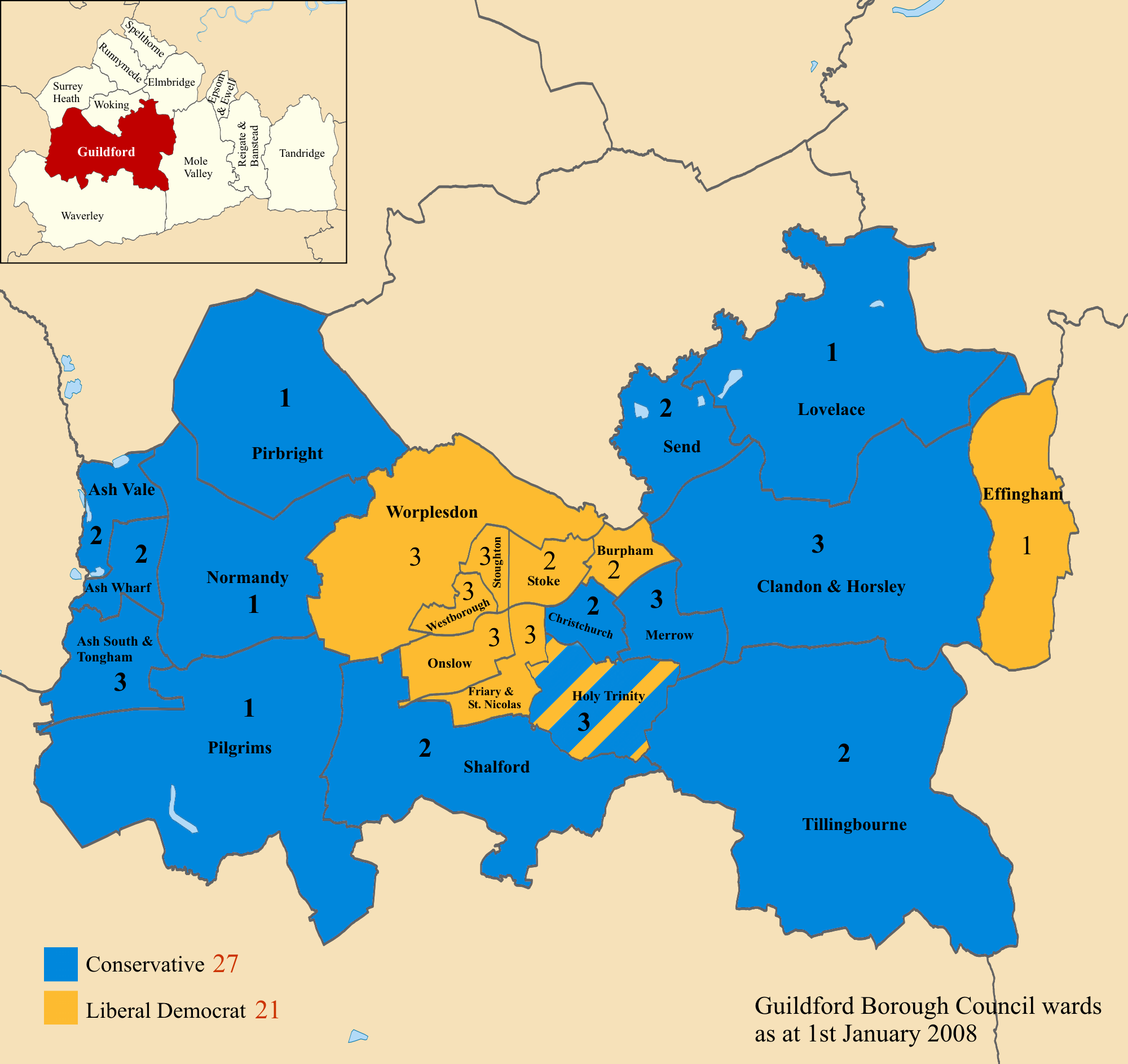
The second map shows the position at the end of 2007 following the 2007 local elections and following the Conservative by-election gain in Holy Trinity ward in November 2007.

== Labour Vote Down ==
In the 2007 council election, the Labour vote slumped in Guildford. The party lost their last two remaining councillors. Only in two of the twenty two wards in Guildford (Stoke and Westborough) did any of the Labour candidates manage to get over 250 votes.

=== Stoke ===
Stoke is the north east part of Guildford town, including Bellfields. Stoke ward elects two councillors. In 2003, the Labour councillors for Stoke, Keith Chesterton and Angela Gunning, had majorities over the third place candidate of 343 and 338 votes respectively. In the 2007 election, the Liberal Democrats gained both these Stoke seats. Keith Chesterton did not stand for reelection. Angela Gunning lost 47.7% of her vote and was pushed into 3rd place, more than 400 votes behind the second place candidate, Alan Muhammed.

=== Westborough ===
Westborough ward is the name given to the west part of Guildford town including Park Barn. It is the other traditional Labour stronghold in Guildford. In 2003, the top placed Labour candidate had polled 1075 votes, 118 less than needed to be elected that year. By contrast, in 2007 the top Labour candidate managed only 308 votes, more than 1000 behind the number needed to get elected. As recently as early 2003, the Labour Party had held all three councillors for this ward, plus the county council electoral division for this area, called Guildford West.

== Only Independent Councillor Does Not Stand in 2007 ==
=== Tillingbourne ===
Tillingbourne is the name of the ward encompassing the surrounding countryside to the south east of Guildford borough, including Shere, Albury and St Martha's. The only independent councillor on Guildford Borough Council between 2003 and 2007, Keith Childs, had been one of the two councillors for Tillingbourne. He did not seek reelection, in 2007. The Conservatives won the seat. The two Conservative candidates taking 67% and 63.9% of the vote respectively.

== Net Gains for Conservatives and Liberal Democrats ==
The Conservatives gained one net seat compared to the position they had entering the election. The Liberal Democrats made a net gain of two seats.

The Conservatives gained one seat from an independent in Tillingbourne (discussed above). The Liberal Democrats gained two seats from Labour in the Stoke Ward (discussed above).

In straight fights between the Conservatives and Liberal Democrats, each party gained two seats and lost two seats, leaving the net position unchanged. The Conservatives gained one seat in each of the Christchurch and Merrow wards, from the Liberal Democrats. The Liberal Democrats gained one seat in each of the Burpham and Onslow wards, from the Conservatives.

== The Conservative – Liberal Democrat Marginal Wards ==
=== Burpham ===
Nick Brougham (Conservative) defending a majority in 2003 of 39 votes, lost to the Liberal Democrat Ed Owen by 137 votes.

=== Christchurch ===
Christchurch ward is to the east of Guildford town. It had the highest voter turnout in Guildford in the 2007 election at 62.1%. In Christchurch, longstanding Liberal Democrat councillor Vivienne Johnson was defending a majority of 3 votes. She lost in the 2007 election, by 74 votes, to Conservative Matt Furniss. Christchurch was the only ward in Guildford where a Green Party candidate stood in the 2007 council elections, he got 5.2% of the vote.

=== Holy Trinity ===
Holy Trinity is the name given to the ward to the south and south east of Guildford town. This ward elects three councillors. In 2003 it returned two Liberal Democrats and one Conservative. Neither of the two Liberal Democrat councillors Tamsy Baker nor Gordon Bridger stood in 2007. The 2007 vote saw a repeat of that 2003 vote with two Liberal Democrats and one Conservative returned. Conservative Sarah Creedy moved up from 3rd to 2nd place on the ballot. Following a by-election gain by the Conservative Melanie Bright, in November 2007, the split on this ward became two Conservative, one Liberal Democrat.

=== Merrow ===
The voter turnout held up better in Merrow than any other ward in Guildford. In 2003 there was a 58.2% turnout, in 2007 that figure only slipped slightly to 56.2%. The Conservatives had won all three seats in Merrow in the 2003 local elections, but lost one of the seats to the Liberal Democrats in a by-election, in July 2003. In that by-election, the Liberal Democrat, Merilyn Gail Spier had a majority of 25, over the Conservative candidate David Carpenter. In the 2007 council election Merilyn Gail Spier lost to David Carpenter, by 191 votes.

=== Onslow ===
In 2003, the Conservative Sheila Ann Kirkland had finished 3rd and was elected. The Liberal Democrat Steve Freeman finished 5th and missed out. In 2007 the positions were reversed, Steve Freeman finished 2nd on the ballot and was elected, Sheila Ann Kirkland finished 4th and missed out.

=== Worplesdon ===
Worplesdon is the area just outside Guildford town to the north and west stretching from Wood St Village to Jacobs Well and including Fairlands and Worplesdon itself. Worplesdon elects three councillors. The 2003 council election had seen Nigel Sutcliffe stand this time as a Conservative, having stood and been elected in 1999 four years earlier as a Liberal Democrat. Nigel Sutcliffe finished in 4th place, 23 votes behind third. He did not stand in 2007. In 2007, the Liberal Democrats held on to the three seats on this ward with a majority of 155 over the highest placed Conservative candidate in 4th place.

== Other Wards ==
=== Ash South & Tongham; Ash Vale; Ash Wharf ===
Ash is to the west of Guildford BC bordering on Aldershot. The Conservatives increased their majorities in all three Ash wards. In Ash South & Tongham the gap between Conservatives and Liberal Democrats rose from 321 to 816. In Ash Vale it rose from 456 to 695 and in Ash Wharf from 266 to 428.

=== Clandon & Horsley ===
East and West Clandon and East and West Horsley are villages to the east of Guildford. The Clandon & Horsley ward returned three Conservative councillors in 2007. The Conservative majority of 1896, over the Liberal Democrats, was more than double the size of the next biggest majority in any ward, in Guildford, in the 2007 council election. Jennifer Powell topped the poll with 80.1% of the vote.

=== Effingham ===
Effingham is a village to the east of Guildford. It elects one councillor. This ward bucked the trend which saw the Conservatives increase their percentage vote in the other rural wards to the east of Guildford in 2007. In Effingham, Liberal Democrat Liz Hogger retained the seat; increasing her majority from 128 to 211.

=== Friary & St. Nicolas ===
Friary & St Nicolas is the name given to the ward comprising much of the centre and south of Guildford town. The Liberal Democrat majority over the Conservatives in Friary & St Nicolas ward reduced from 1014 to 553, compared to the 2003 local election.

=== Lovelace; Send ===
To the north east of Guildford borough are the wards of Send and Lovelace. The later includes the villages of Ripley, Ockham and Wisley. Send elects two councillors, Lovelace one. In 2007, the Conservatives held on to both wards; increasing their percentage vote. In Lovelace the Conservatives had a majority of 433 over the Liberal Democrats and in Send 708.

=== Normandy; Pilgrims; Shalford ===
The Conservatives increased their majorities in the rural wards to the south and west of Guildford.

In Normandy, which elects only one councillor, Conservative Diana Lockyer-Nibbs got 77.1% of the vote, up from 61.7% in 2003.

In Pilgrims ward, another ward electing only one councillor, Conservative Tony Rooth received 83.3% of the vote, up from 67.7% in 2003. This was the highest percentage vote for any candidate, of any party, in any ward, in Guildford, in the 2007 council election.

In Shalford, a two councillor ward, the Conservative majority over the Liberal Democrats increased from 289, in 2003, to 495, in 2007.

=== Pirbright ===
Pirbright is the rural area towards the north west of Guildford borough. It elects one councillor. Conservative Mike Nevins saw his majority cut from 400 to 226.

=== Stoughton ===
In the 2003 Guildford council election, Stoughton, to the north west of Guildford town, was the second safest Liberal Democrat ward; Friary & St Nicolas ward being the safest. Stoughton ward elects three councillors. In 2007, three Liberal Democrats were again elected to this ward. The gap between the Liberal Democrats and Conservatives increased from 430, in 2003, to 586, in 2007. Gillian Michelle Harwood and Wendy May, neither of who stood in 2003, where amongst those elected.

== Fewer Split Wards in 2007, than 2003. ==
Going into the election five of the wards had been split between the Conservatives and Liberal Democrats:

Conservative – Liberal Democrat split wards prior to 2007 local elections
Ward	Number of Councillors	Split	Party of Councillor Topping Poll in 2003
Burpham	2	1C, 1LD	Liberal Democrat
Christchurch	2	1C, 1LD	Conservative
Holy Trinity	3	1C, 2LD	Liberal Democrat
Merrow	3	2C, 1LD	Conservative
Onslow	3	1C, 2LD	Liberal Democrat

Additionally the Tillingbourne ward was split between an independent councillor and a Conservative one.

Following the election Christchurch, Merrow and Tillingbourne became purely Conservative wards and Burpham and Onslow became purely Liberal Democrat wards. The only remaining split ward on Guildford Borough Council was Holy Trinity.
