= North Dorset =

North Dorset may refer to:

- North Dorset (district), a local government district between 1974 and 2019
- North Dorset (UK Parliament constituency)
- North Dorset RFC, a rugby union club
