= 1973 Chichester District Council election =

1973 UK local government election

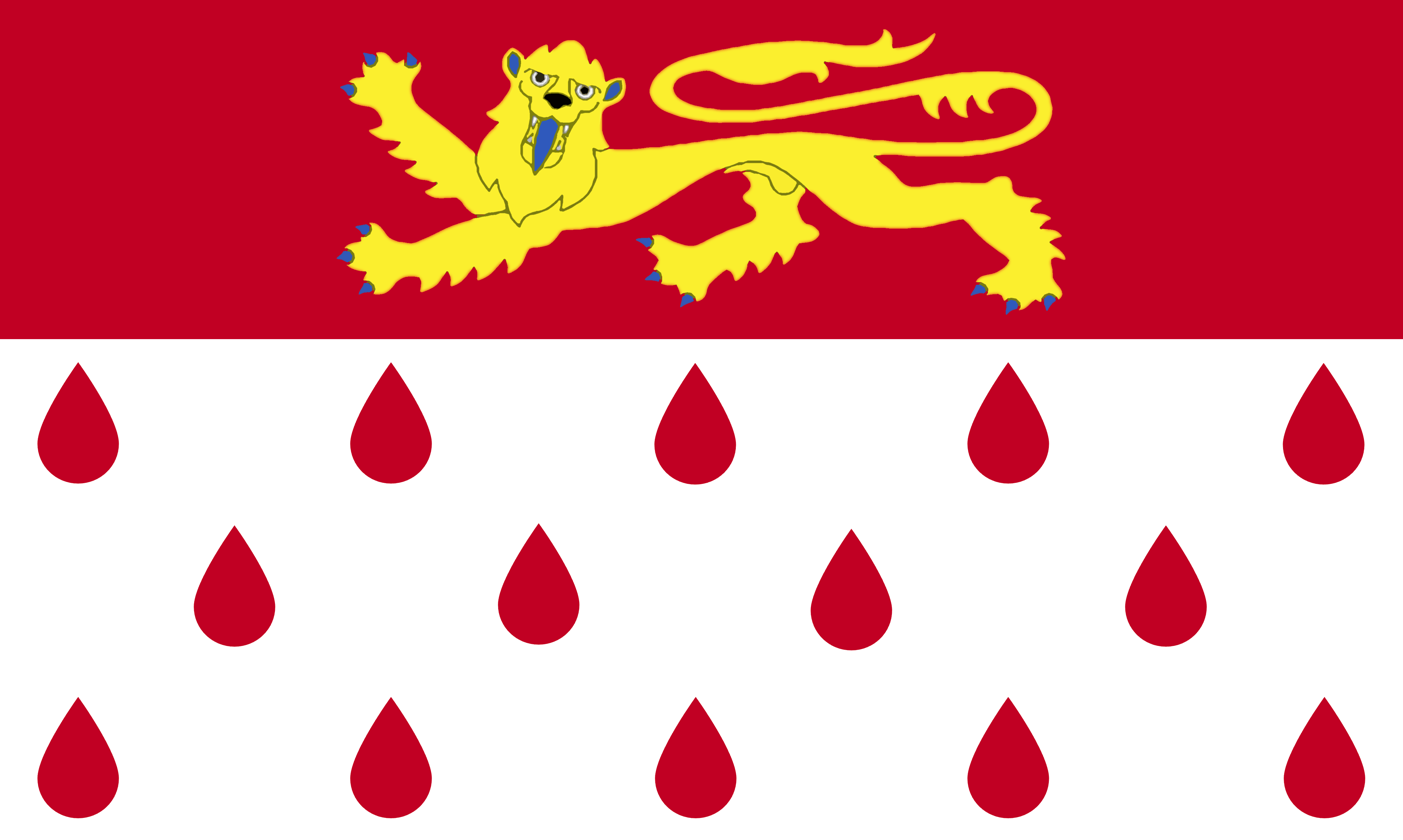
7 June 1973	1976 →

All 50 seats to Chichester District Council 26 seats needed for a majority
	First party	Second party
Party	Independent	Conservative
Seats won	22	18
Popular vote	11,716	7,267
Percentage	32.3%	20.0%
Council control after election
No overall control

Elections to Chichester District Council in West Sussex, United Kingdom were held on 7 June 1973.

The whole council was up for election and resulted in no overall control.

== Election result ==
Chichester District Council Election Result 1973
Party	Seats	Gains	Losses	Net gain/loss	Seats %	Votes %	Votes	+/−
Independent	22	N/A	N/A	N/A	44.0	32.3	11,716	N/A
Conservative	18	N/A	N/A	N/A	36.0	20.0	7,267	N/A
Liberal	6	N/A	N/A	N/A	12.0	21.5	7,831	N/A
Residents	3	N/A	N/A	N/A	6.0	8.1	2,933	N/A
Labour	1	N/A	N/A	N/A	2.0	18.1	6,601	N/A

↓
22	18	6	3	1
Independent	Conservative	Liberal	R	L

== Ward results ==
Birdham (1 seat)
Party	Candidate	Votes	%	±
Conservative	J. Darley	Unopposed		
Turnout		0	0.0	N/A
Registered electors		1,334		
Conservative win (new seat)				

Bosham (2 seats)
Party	Candidate	Votes	%	±
Independent	F. Parham	Unopposed		
Independent	J. Lillywhite	Unopposed		
Turnout		0	0.0	N/A
Registered electors		2,878		
Independent win (new seat)				
Independent win (new seat)				

Boxgrove (1 seat)
Party	Candidate	Votes	%	±
Conservative	E. Kirkby-Bott	Unopposed		
Turnout		0	0.0	N/A
Registered electors		1,348		
Conservative win (new seat)				

Bury (1 seat)
Party	Candidate	Votes	%	±
Conservative	C. Roberts	Unopposed		
Turnout		0	0.0	N/A
Registered electors		1,188		
Conservative win (new seat)				

Chichester East (3 seats)
Party	Candidate	Votes	%	±%
Liberal	C. Tupper	728	32.2	N/A
Conservative	M. Pigot	698	30.4	N/A
Liberal	A. French	679		N/A
Conservative	R. Shields	631		N/A
Labour	D. Shepherd	588	37.3	N/A
Labour	E. Goodland	526		N/A
Labour	J. Nicholson	519		N/A
Turnout		4,369	46.0	N/A
Registered electors		4,376		
Liberal win (new seat)				
Conservative win (new seat)				
Liberal win (new seat)				

Chichester South (3 seats)
Party	Candidate	Votes	%	±%
Liberal	J. Seddon	925	48.2	N/A
Liberal	P. Weston	896		N/A
Liberal	K. Smith	807		N/A
Conservative	P. Combes	584	14.4	N/A
Labour	A. Ingram	515	37.4	N/A
Labour	M. Sharpe	440		N/A
Labour	P. Sharpe	423		N/A
Turnout		4,590	45.9	N/A
Registered electors		4,405		
Liberal win (new seat)				
Liberal win (new seat)				
Liberal win (new seat)				

Chichester West (5 seats)
Party	Candidate	Votes	%	±%
Independent	G. Tullett	1,278	10.6	N/A
Independent	F. Craig	1,148	9.6	N/A
Conservative	D. Hoult	1,110	18.0	N/A
Independent	E. Craig	1,072	8.9	N/A
Conservative	W. Doody	1,051		N/A
Liberal	L. Holden	898	20.0	N/A
Independent	W. Pope	838	7.0	N/A
Liberal	Z. Booker	777		N/A
Liberal	L. Cohen	719		N/A
Independent	J. Nelson	580	4.8	N/A
Labour	P. Keen	549	21.1	N/A
Labour	T. Rooth	532		N/A
Labour	J. Bennett	515		N/A
Labour	S. White	485		N/A
Labour	R. Hemblade	452		N/A
Turnout		12,004	59.7	
Registered electors		6,428		
Independent win (new seat)				
Independent win (new seat)				
Conservative win (new seat)				
Independent win (new seat)				
Conservative win (new seat)				

Donnington (1 seat)
Party	Candidate	Votes	%	±
Conservative	J. Laird	Unopposed		
Turnout		0	0.0	N/A
Registered electors		1,482		
Conservative win (new seat)				

Easebourne (1 seat)
Party	Candidate	Votes	%	±%
Conservative	E. Knight	381	57.1	N/A
Labour	A. Groves	286	42.9	N/A
Turnout		667	45.0	N/A
Registered electors		1,481		
Conservative win (new seat)				

East Wittering (1 seat)
Party	Candidate	Votes	%	±%
Conservative	C. Craven	327	50.8	N/A
Liberal	M. Sell	317	49.2	N/A
Turnout		644	32.7	N/A
Registered electors		1,971		
Conservative win (new seat)				

Fernhurst (2 seats)
Party	Candidate	Votes	%	±%
Independent	R. Cole	470	27.0	N/A
Independent	R. Pape	370	21.3	N/A
Liberal	S. Schlich	342	32.6	N/A
Labour	R. Craddock	292	16.8	N/A
Liberal	B. Mee	225		N/A
Independent	A. Shore	41	2.3	N/A
Turnout		1,740	48.2	N/A
Registered electors		2,289		
Independent win (new seat)				
Independent win (new seat)				

Funtington (1 seat)
Party	Candidate	Votes	%	±%
Independent	D. Gauntlett	275	54.6	N/A
Independent	E. Dunlop	198	39.5	N/A
Independent	E. Andrews	30	5.9	N/A
Turnout		503	28.5	N/A
Registered electors		1,766		
Independent win (new seat)				

Graffham (1 seat)
Party	Candidate	Votes	%	±%
Independent	K. Murray	372	63.2	N/A
Labour	C. Alexander	119	20.2	N/A
Independent	T. Vaughan	98	16.6	N/A
Turnout		589	38.9	N/A
Registered electors		1,515		
Independent win (new seat)				

Harting (1 seat)
Party	Candidate	Votes	%	±%
Independent	H. Booker	526	81.6	N/A
Independent	D. Bird	119	18.4	N/A
Turnout		645	46.5	N/A
Registered electors		1,387		
Independent win (new seat)				

Hunston (1 seat)
Party	Candidate	Votes	%	±
Independent	M. Nicholson	Unopposed		
Turnout		0	0.0	N/A
Registered electors		1,670		
Independent win (new seat)				

Lavant (1 seat)
Party	Candidate	Votes	%	±%
Independent	N. Butcher	250	50.1	N/A
Liberal	F. Heald	249	49.9	N/A
Turnout		499	36.0	N/A
Registered electors		1,388		
Independent win (new seat)				

Linchmere (1 seat)
Party	Candidate	Votes	%	±
Independent	R. De Hailes	Unopposed		
Turnout		0	0.0	N/A
Registered electors		1,174		
Independent win (new seat)				

Lodsworth (1 seat)
Party	Candidate	Votes	%	±
Independent	R. Hancock	Unopposed		
Turnout		0	0.0	N/A
Registered electors		1,405		
Independent win (new seat)				

Midhurst (2 seats)
Party	Candidate	Votes	%	±%
Independent	P. Burne	844	44.8	N/A
Independent	D. Mott	680	36.1	N/A
Labour	P. Pritchard	190	19.1	N/A
Labour	T. Hart	170		N/A
Turnout		1,884	38.3	N/A
Registered electors		2,702		
Independent win (new seat)				
Independent win (new seat)				

Oving (1 seat)
Party	Candidate	Votes	%	±
Conservative	A. Sampson	Unopposed		
Turnout		0	0.0	N/A
Registered electors		1,169		
Conservative win (new seat)				

Petworth (2 seats)
Party	Candidate	Votes	%	±
Conservative	C. Linton	Unopposed		
Conservative	J. Duncton	Unopposed		
Turnout		0	0.0	N/A
Registered electors		2,461		
Conservative win (new seat)				
Conservative win (new seat)				

Plaistow (2 seats)
Party	Candidate	Votes	%	±
Independent	P. Luttman-Johnson	Unopposed		
Conservative	T. Micklem	Unopposed		
Turnout		0	0.0	N/A
Registered electors		2,877		
Independent win (new seat)				
Conservative win (new seat)				

Rogate (1 seat)
Party	Candidate	Votes	%	±
Independent	J. Henslow	Unopposed		
Turnout		0	0.0	N/A
Registered electors		1,423		
Independent win (new seat)				

Selsey (4 seats)
Party	Candidate	Votes	%	±
Conservative	R. Seamen	Unopposed		
Conservative	W. Spragg	Unopposed		
Conservative	H. Meston	Unopposed		
Conservative	W. Carey	Unopposed		
Turnout		0	0.0	N/A
Registered electors		5,722		
Conservative win (new seat)				
Conservative win (new seat)				
Conservative win (new seat)				
Conservative win (new seat)				

Sidlesham (1 seat)
Party	Candidate	Votes	%	±
Labour	D. Mitchell	Unopposed		
Turnout		0	0.0	N/A
Registered electors		1,134		
Labour win (new seat)				

Southbourne (4 seats)
Party	Candidate	Votes	%	±%
Residents	R. Roberts	883	40.4	N/A
Residents	J. Robinson	712		N/A
Residents	L. Denby	707		N/A
Independent	F. Feltham	635	8.7	N/A
Conservative	E. Ward	634	31.1	N/A
Residents	C. Game	631		N/A
Conservative	A. Bonner	591		N/A
Independent	D. Feltham	575	7.9	N/A
Conservative	E. Brundrett	538		N/A
Conservative	K. Rawlings	496		N/A
Independent	R. Marshall	447	6.1	N/A
Independent	R. Piercy	414	5.7	N/A
Turnout		7,263	43.7	N/A
Registered electors		4,926		
Residents win (new seat)				
Residents win (new seat)				
Residents win (new seat)				
Independent win (new seat)				

Stedham (1 seat)
Party	Candidate	Votes	%	±
Independent	V. Saunders	Unopposed		
Turnout		0	0.0	N/A
Registered electors		1,585		
Independent win (new seat)				

Stoughton (1 seat)
Party	Candidate	Votes	%	±%
Independent	J. Mann	231	50.5	N/A
Conservative	H. Gauntlett	226	49.5	N/A
Turnout		457	36.1	N/A
Registered electors		1,267		
Independent win (new seat)				

West Wittering (1 seat)
Party	Candidate	Votes	%	±
Independent	B. Passmore	Unopposed		
Turnout		0	0.0	N/A
Registered electors		1,830		
Independent win (new seat)				

Westbourne (1 seat)
Party	Candidate	Votes	%	±%
Liberal	D. Rudkin	269	54.3	N/A
Independent	S. Macdonald-Smith	226	45.7	N/A
Turnout		495	34.7	N/A
Registered electors		1,426		
Liberal win (new seat)				

Wisborough Green (1 seat)
Party	Candidate	Votes	%	±
Conservative	J. Illius	Unopposed		
Turnout		0	0.0	N/A
Registered electors		1,832		
Conservative win (new seat)				
