= Plaistow, West Sussex =

Village and parish in West Sussex, England

Coordinates: 51.06939°N 0.56782°W

Plaistow
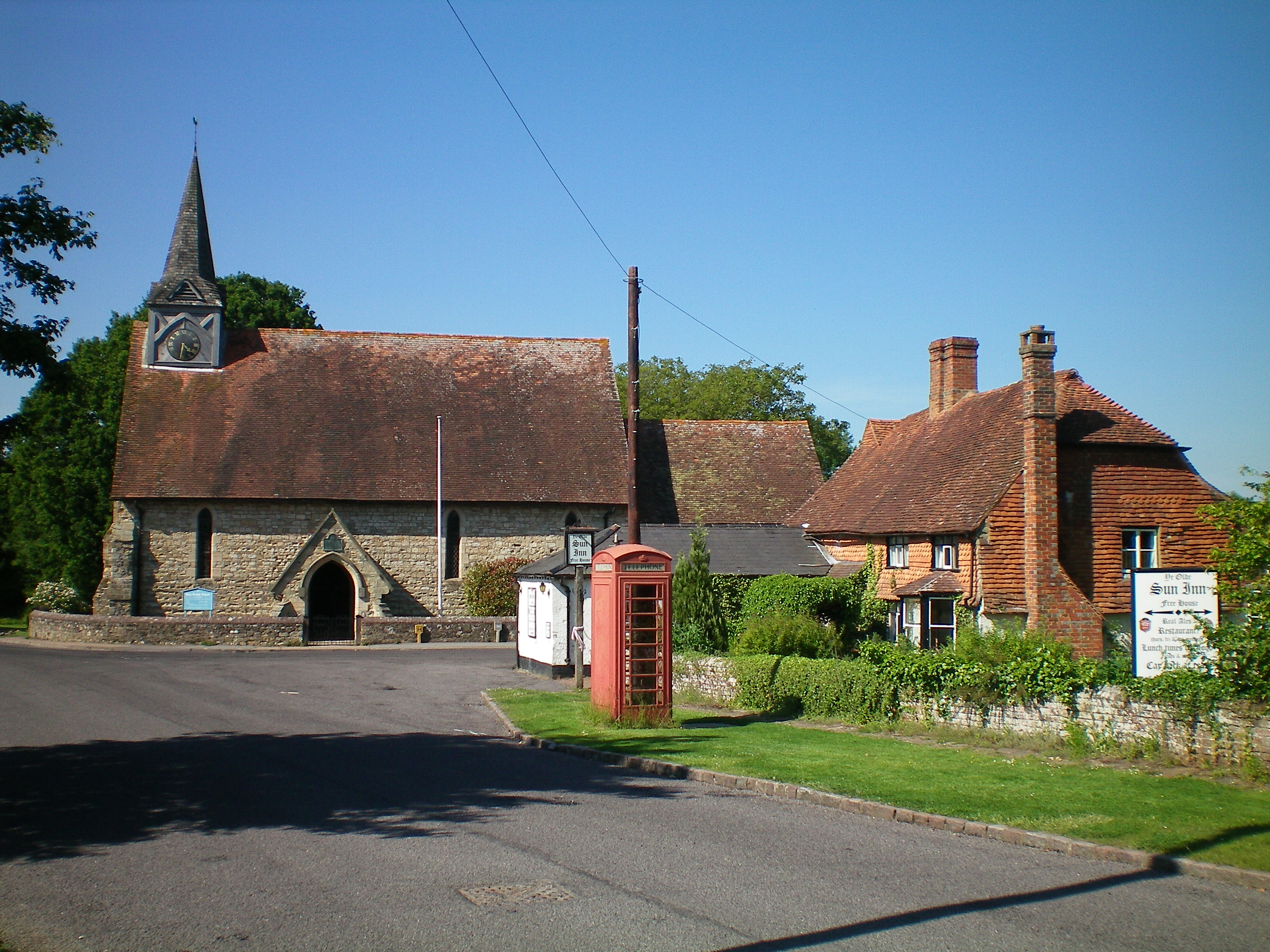
- Plaistow village centre

- Location within West Sussex
- Population: 1,898 (2011)
- OS grid reference: TQ004309
  - London: 36 miles (58 km) NNE
- Civil parish: Alfold
- District: Chichester
- Shire county: West Sussex
- Region: South East
- Country: England
- Sovereign state: United Kingdom
- Post town: BILLINGSHURST
- Postcode district: RH14
- Dialling code: 01403
- Police: Sussex
- Fire: West Sussex
- Ambulance: South East Coast
- UK Parliament: Chichester

Plaistow (/ˈplæstoʊ/ PLAST-oh) is a village and civil parish in the north of the Chichester District of West Sussex, England. There is a village green, a recreation ground, a children's playground, a village pond, a shop, a pub (The Sun Inn) and the Anglican Church.

There are over thirty Grade II listed buildings in the village. The Sun Inn was purchased by the Pullen family in 1807. Holy Trinity Church (a Chapel of Ease) was once a wooden structure which was destroyed by fire. The church was rebuilt in 1859.

Plaistow and Kirdford Primary School was built in 1869. A plaque on the front of the school's original Victorian building acknowledges the significant funding from John Napper, Esquire of Ifold House, who then owned much of the land in the civil parish.

The Parish lies on the northern boundary of West Sussex, and is made up of four settlements: Plaistow village and the hamlets of Ifold, Durfold Wood and Shillinglee. Ifold is the largest of the settlements and has the largest population in the Parish. It has a land area of 2102 hectares (5192 acres). In the 2001 census 1856 people lived in 701 households, of whom 910 were economically active.

Plaistow village had its own football club, Plaistow FC, which formed in 1931 and was admitted to the Horsham and District League. They now play in the West Sussex Football League. The home ground is 'Foxfields'.

== Landmarks ==
Chiddingfold Forest is a Site of Special Scientific Interest partly within the parish. This is an important butterfly egg-laying area. There are also rare moths in this locality including: the argent and sable, common fan-foot, white-line snout, waved carpet and drab looper.

Chiddingfold Forest is home to the Bechstein's bat. Three maternity colonies have been identified which have at least eighty breeding females.

== Governance ==
The electoral ward was Plaistow, encompassing the Parishes of Plaistow, Loxwood, Lurgashall and Northchapel but in 2019, following a district boundary review, it was split between the Fernhurst and Loxwood wards.

At the 2011 Census Plaistow Ward had a total ward population of 4,784.
