= Chichester Central =

Electoral division of West Sussex, England

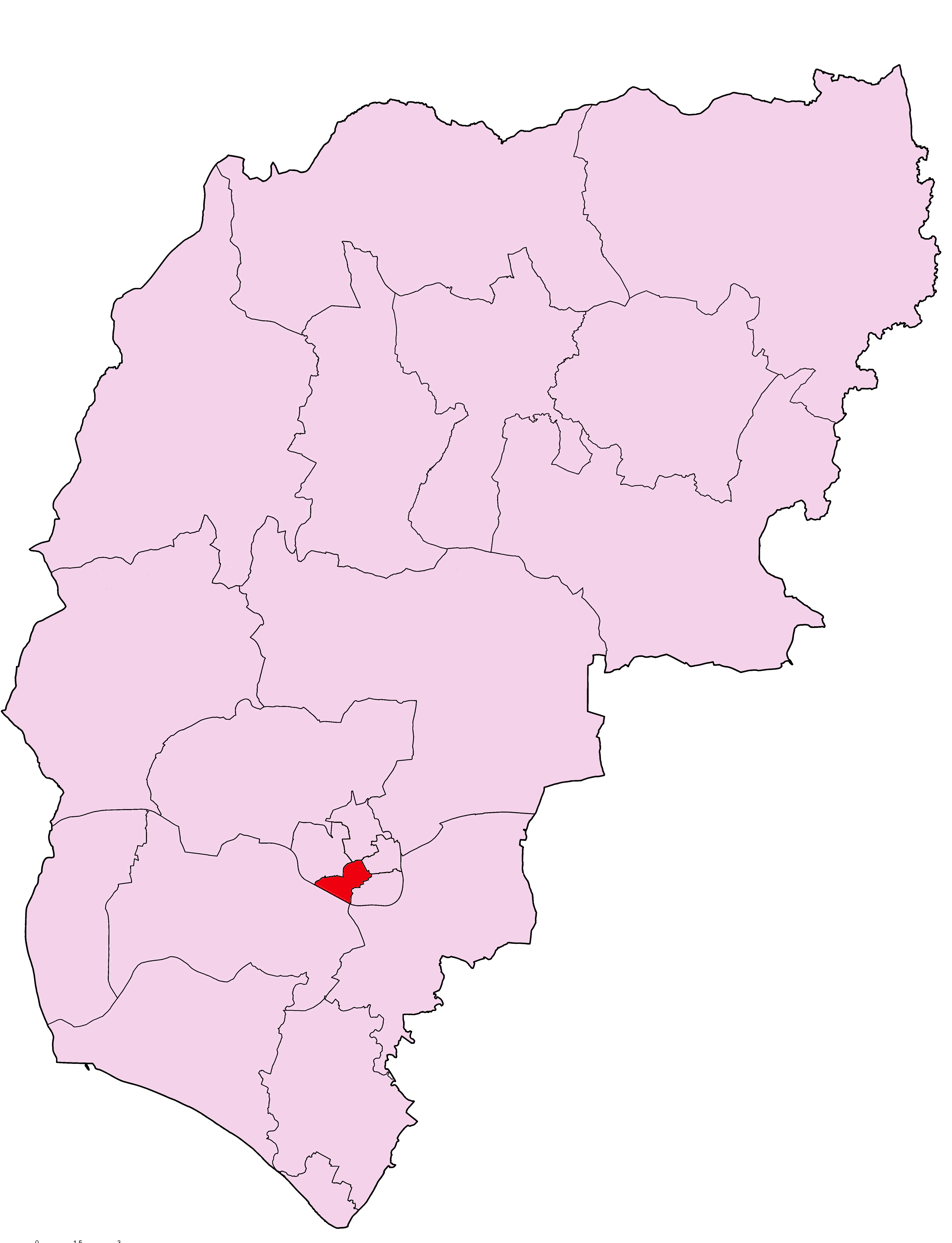
- Shown within Chichester
- Population: 2,241 (2019)
- District: Chichester
- Ceremonial county: West Sussex
- Country: England
- Sovereign state: United Kingdom
- UK Parliament: Chichester
- Councillors: James Vivian (LD)

Chichester Central is an electoral ward of Chichester District, West Sussex, England, and returns one member to sit on Chichester District Council.

Following a district boundary review, Chichester Central was created from the neighbouring wards of Chichester (East, North and South) in 2019.

== Councillor ==
Year	Member	Party
2023	James Vivian	Liberal Democrats (UK)
2019	Martyn Bell	Conservative

== Election results ==
Chichester District Council Election 2023: Chichester Central
Party	Candidate	Votes	%	±%
Liberal Democrats	James Vivian	404	46.0	▲5.9
Conservative	Nicholas Roberts	275	31.3	▼13.0
Labour	James Field	107	12.2	▼0.3
Green	Mark Record	92	10.5	New
Majority		129	14.5	N/A
Turnout		889	41.29	▲2.83
Liberal Democrats gain from Conservative		Swing	▲9.6	

Chichester District Council Election 2019: Chichester Central
Party	Candidate	Votes	%	±%
Conservative	Martyn John Bell	381	44.3	New
Liberal Democrats	Anne Mary Dorothy Scicluna	353	40.1	New
Labour	Malcolm Shepherd	108	12.5	New
Majority		28	3.2	N/A
Turnout		861	38.46	N/A
Conservative win (new seat)				
