= Chichester East (ward) =

Electoral ward in West Sussex, England

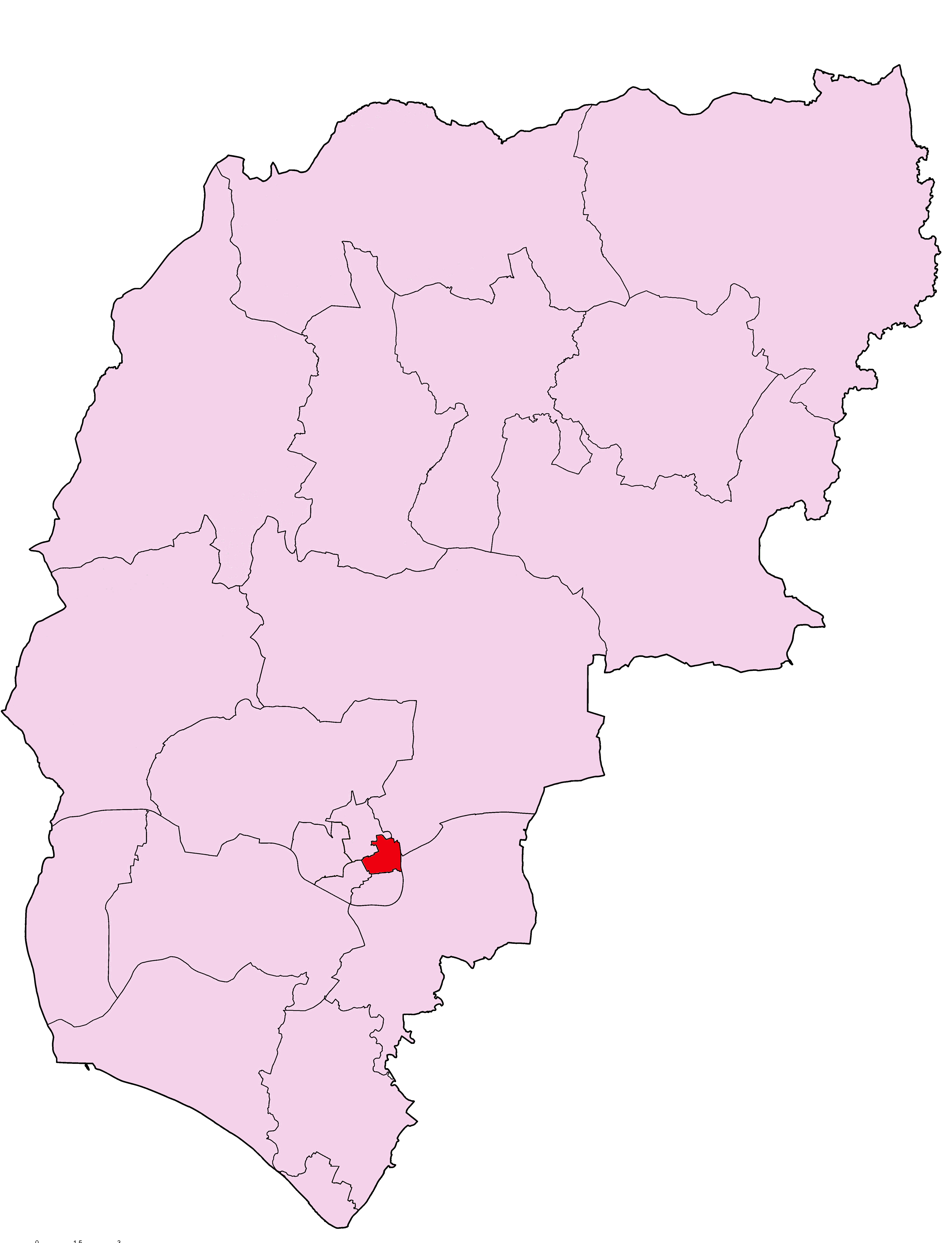
- Shown within Chichester
- Population: 8,480 (2011)
- District: Chichester
- Ceremonial county: West Sussex
- Country: England
- Sovereign state: United Kingdom
- UK Parliament: Chichester
- Councillors: Bill Brisbane (L); Rhys Chant (L)

Chichester East is an electoral ward of Chichester District, West Sussex, England, and returns two members to sit on Chichester District Council.

== Ward Profile ==
Chichester East ward is one of four wards within the city of Chichester, along with Chichester North, Chichester South and Chichester West. Since the formation of Chichester District Council in 1973, the ward has been a Liberal Democrat stronghold. In May 2015, the Conservative party candidates won all three seats for the first time.

=== Population ===
In 2011, the population of Chichester East was 8,480, representing 7.5% of the total population of the Chichester District. It is the largest ward by population in the Chichester District.

The ward has a far higher proportion of ethnic minorities than average in the District. Approximately 7.8% of the population in the ward is an ethnic minority, compared to 3.1% in the District.

Chichester East has a lower proportion of owner-occupied housing than the District, with 41.5% owning their own home in the ward compared to 67.2% in the District.

== Boundaries ==
=== Boundary review ===
In March 2016, following a review of the ward structures, Chichester District Council proposed increasing the number of wards in the city from four to five. The proposal would reduce the number of members from three to two, with a reduction in the size of the electorate of approximately 1,500. The new proposed ward would cover five areas:

- The area between St Pancras and The Hornet east of Needlemakers and the triangle bounded by New Park Road, Spitalfield Lane, and St Pancras.
- The Swanfield Estate.
- The area between Green Lane and the by-pass bounded by Oving Road and Westhampnett Road.
- South side of Oving Road.
- The Bostock Road area and the arc south of Kingsmead Avenue.

== Councillors ==
Year	Member	Party	Member	Party	Member	Party
2023	Bill Brisbane	Liberal Democrat	Rhys Chant	Liberal Democrat		
2021*	Bill Brisbane	Liberal Democrat	Sarah Lishman	Labour		
2019	Kevin Hughes	Labour	Sarah Lishman	Labour		
2015	Jane Kilby	Conservative	Thomas Dempster	Conservative	Les Hixson	Conservative
2011	Quentin Cox	Liberal Democrat	Tony French	Liberal Democrat	Michael Woolley	Liberal Democrat
2007	Quentin Cox	Liberal Democrat	Tony French	Liberal Democrat	Susan Fairley	Liberal Democrat
2003	Quentin Cox	Liberal Democrat	Tony French	Liberal Democrat	Eva French	Liberal Democrat
1999	Quentin Cox	Liberal Democrat	Tony French	Liberal Democrat	Eva French	Liberal Democrat
1995	Colin Tupper	Liberal Democrat	Tony French	Liberal Democrat	Eva French	Liberal Democrat
1991	Colin Tupper	Liberal Democrat	Tony French	Liberal Democrat	Eva French	Liberal Democrat
1987	Colin Tupper	Liberal Democrat	Tony French	Liberal Democrat	Eva French	Liberal Democrat
1983	Colin Tupper	Liberal Democrat	Tony French	Liberal Democrat	Eva French	Liberal Democrat
1979	Colin Tupper	Liberal Democrat	Tony French	Liberal Democrat	P Combes	Liberal Democrat
1976	J Finlay	Liberal Democrat	Tony French	Liberal Democrat	P Combes	Liberal Democrat
1973	M Pigot	Liberal Democrat	Tony French	Liberal Democrat	P Combes	Liberal Democrat

== Election results ==
Chichester District Council Election 2019: Chichester East
Party	Candidate	Votes	%	±%
Labour	Kevin Garry Hughes*	462	17.7	
Labour	Sarah Carol Lishman*	441	16.9	
Conservative	Christopher Carl Spink	380	14.5	
Conservative	Jane Louise Kilby	355	13.6	
Liberal Democrats	John Francis Hughes	283	10.8	
Green	Pauline Gaskin	279	10.7	
Liberal Democrats	Michael Woolley	246	9.4	
UKIP	Terrence Leonard Walters	146	5.6	
Turnout		2,612	30.99	
Labour gain from Conservative		Swing		
Labour gain from Conservative		Swing		

Chichester District Council Election 2015: Chichester East
Party	Candidate	Votes	%	±%
Conservative	Jane Louise Kilby*	1381	16.53	
Conservative	Thomas Henry Dempster*	1328	15.90	
Conservative	Leslie Ronald Hixson*	1214	14.54	
Liberal Democrats	Quentin James Robson Cox	1184	14.18	
Liberal Democrats	Anthony John French	1161	13.90	
Labour	Benjamin Earnshaw-Mansell	1044	12.50	
Liberal Democrats	Michael Woolley	1040	12.45	
Total votes		8352		
Turnout		3631	57.15	

Chichester District Council Election 2011: Chichester East
Party	Candidate	Votes	%	±%
Liberal Democrats	Quentin Robson Cox*	1103	27.75	
Liberal Democrats	Tony French*	1085	27.30	
Liberal Democrats	Michael Woolley*	1082	27.22	
Labour	Benjamin Earnshaw-Mansell	705	17.74	
Total votes		3975		
Turnout				

Chichester District Council Election 2007: Chichester East
Party	Candidate	Votes	%	±%
Liberal Democrats	Quentin Robson Cox*	777	19.37	+0.37
Liberal Democrats	Tony French*	768	19.15	+0.55
Liberal Democrats	Susan Fairley*	754	18.80	
Conservative	Hilary Anne Flynn	541	13.49	
Conservative	Paul Newton-Lewis	541	13.49	
Conservative	Robert Pettigrew	422	10.51	
Labour	June Mary Leonard	208	5.19	
Total votes		4011		
Turnout		1555	26.84	

Chichester District Council Election 2003: Chichester East
Party	Candidate	Votes	%	±%
Liberal Democrats	Quentin Robson Cox*	653	19.0	
Liberal Democrats	Anthony John French*	639	18.6	
Liberal Democrats	Eva Marliese French*	635	18.5	
Conservative	Rebecca Elizabeth Harris	304	8.8	
Conservative	Gina Margaret Simpson	283	8.2	
UKIP	Nigel Degge Wilmot Sitwell	247	7.2	
Green	Josephine Eckhard	191	5.6	
Labour	Peter John Nutt	191	5.6	
Labour	John Smith	156	4.5	
Labour	Doris Bryson Walton	141	4.1	
Turnout		3440	24.5	

Chichester District Council By-Election 7 May 1998: Chichester East
Party	Candidate	Votes	%	±%
Liberal Democrats		673	50.2	−2.0
Conservative		425	31.7	+7.8
Labour		242	18.1	−5.8
Majority		248	18.5	
Turnout		1,340		
Liberal Democrats hold		Swing		

* Elected

== See also ==
- Wards of Chichester District
- Chichester District
