= 2027 Chichester District Council election =

2027 English local government election

- 6 May 2027

All 36 seats to Chichester District Council 19 seats needed for a majority
Leader	Adrian Moss	Roy Briscoe	Timothy Johnson (Note: Leader of the Green & Local Alliance group.)
Party	Liberal Democrats	Conservative	Local Alliance
Leader's seat	Harbour Villages	Westbourne	Selsey South
Last election	25 seats, 50.9%	5 seats, 30.9%	4 seats, 4.1%
Current seats	24	5	4
Leader	Timothy Johnson
Party	Green	Independent
Leader's seat	Selsey South
Last election	2 seats, 6.7%	0 seats, 1.5%
Current seats	2	1
Incumbent Leader
Adrian Moss
Liberal Democrats

The 2027 Chichester District Council election will be held on 6 May 2027 to elect members of Chichester District Council in West Sussex, England. This will be on the same day as other local elections held across the United Kingdom.

== Background ==
=== Local government reorganisation ===
Due to proposed structural changes to local government in England, the 2023 election would have been the final election to the council before it was abolished and replaced by a new unitary authority, although the structure of this new authority was yet to be decided. However, on 7 September 2026, the government announced it was withdrawing plans for the planned restructuring pending review. Following this announcement, local elections due to be held in 2027 under the existing local electoral calendar would proceed.

== Summary ==
=== Election result ===
2027 Chichester District Council election
Party	Candidates	Seats	Gains	Losses	Net gain/loss	Seats %	Votes %	Votes	+/−
Liberal Democrats		24 (Note: Current seats.)							
Conservative		5							
Local Alliance		4							
Green		2							
Independent		1							
