= Selsey South =

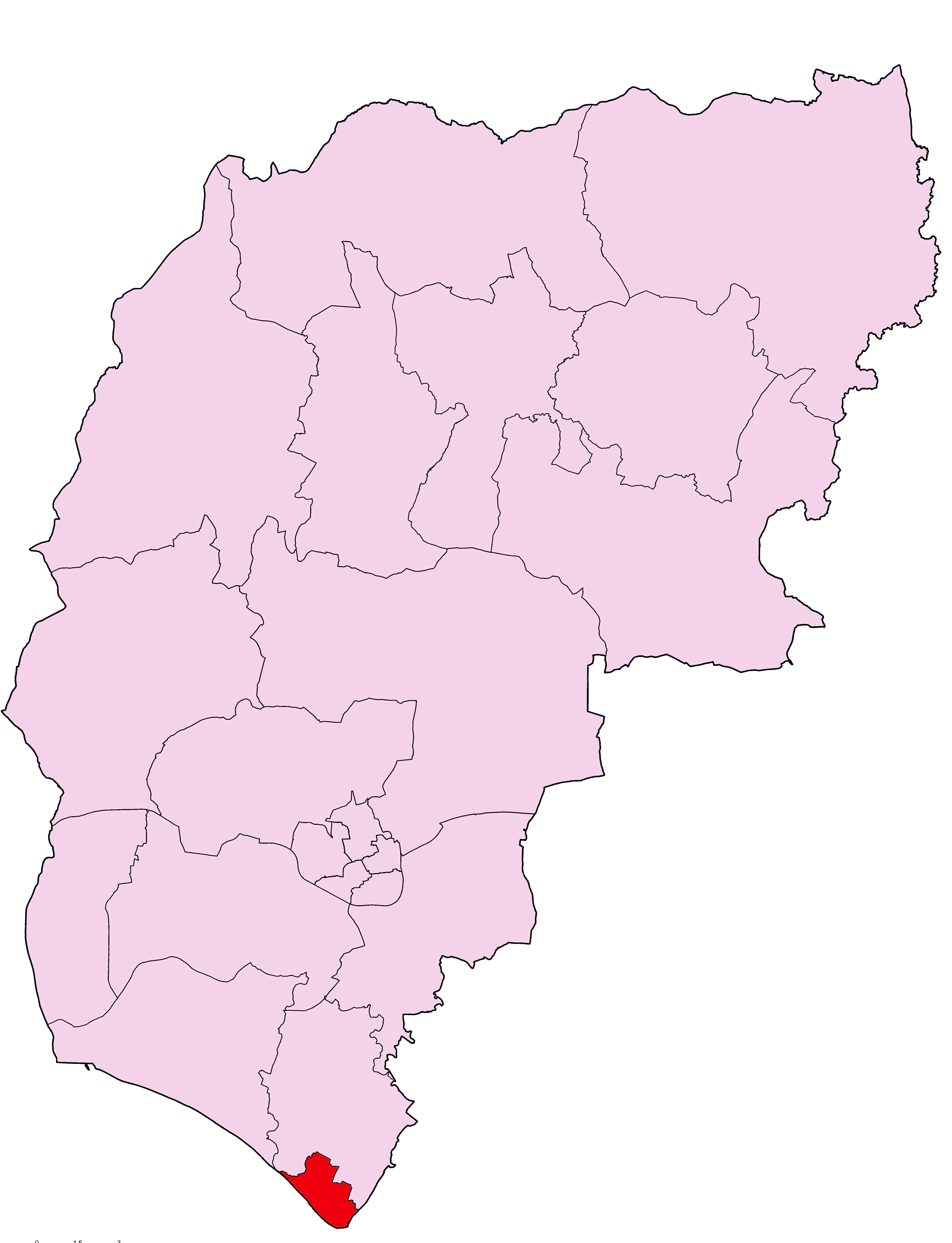
- Shown within Chichester
- Population: 4,926 (2019)
- District: Chichester
- Ceremonial county: West Sussex
- Country: England
- Sovereign state: United Kingdom
- UK Parliament: Chichester
- Councillors: Timothy Johnson (LA); John Elliott (C)

Selsey South is an electoral ward of Chichester District, West Sussex, England and returns two members to sit on Chichester District Council.

Following a district boundary review, the former ward of Selsey North was split and merged into Selsey South in 2019.

== Councillors ==
Year	Member	Party	Member	Party
2019	Timothy Johnson	Local Alliance	John Elliott	Conservative
2015	Roger Barrow	Conservative	John Elliott	Conservative
2007	Fred Robertson	Independent	Roland O'Brien	Independent

== Election results ==
Chichester District Council Election 2019: Selsey South
Party	Candidate	Votes	%	±%
Local Alliance	Timothy Simon Charles Johnson*	811	31.0	
Conservative	John William Evans Elliott*	735	28.1	
Conservative	Peter Roger Barrow	513	19.6	
Liberal Democrats	Simon Scotland	265	10.1	
Labour	Bridget Ash	147	5.6	
Labour	Mark Andrew Farwell	127	4.9	
Turnout		2,616	31.40	
Local Alliance gain from Conservative				
Conservative hold		Swing		

Chichester District Council Election 2007: Selsey South
Party	Candidate	Votes	%	±%
Independent	Fred Robertson*	617	21.72	
Independent	Roland O'Brien*	541	19.04	
Conservative	Eddie Vines	538	18.94	
Conservative	John Thomas Curtis	531	18.70	
UKIP	Bernard Arthur Smith	178	6.27	
Liberal Democrats	Jenny Graves	162	5.70	
Liberal Democrats	John Edward Shade	114	4.01	
Labour	Ian Bell	88	3.09	
Labour	Wendy Virginia Pengelly	72	2.53	
Total votes		2841		
Turnout		1484	41.31	

* Elected
