= Sidlesham with Selsey North =

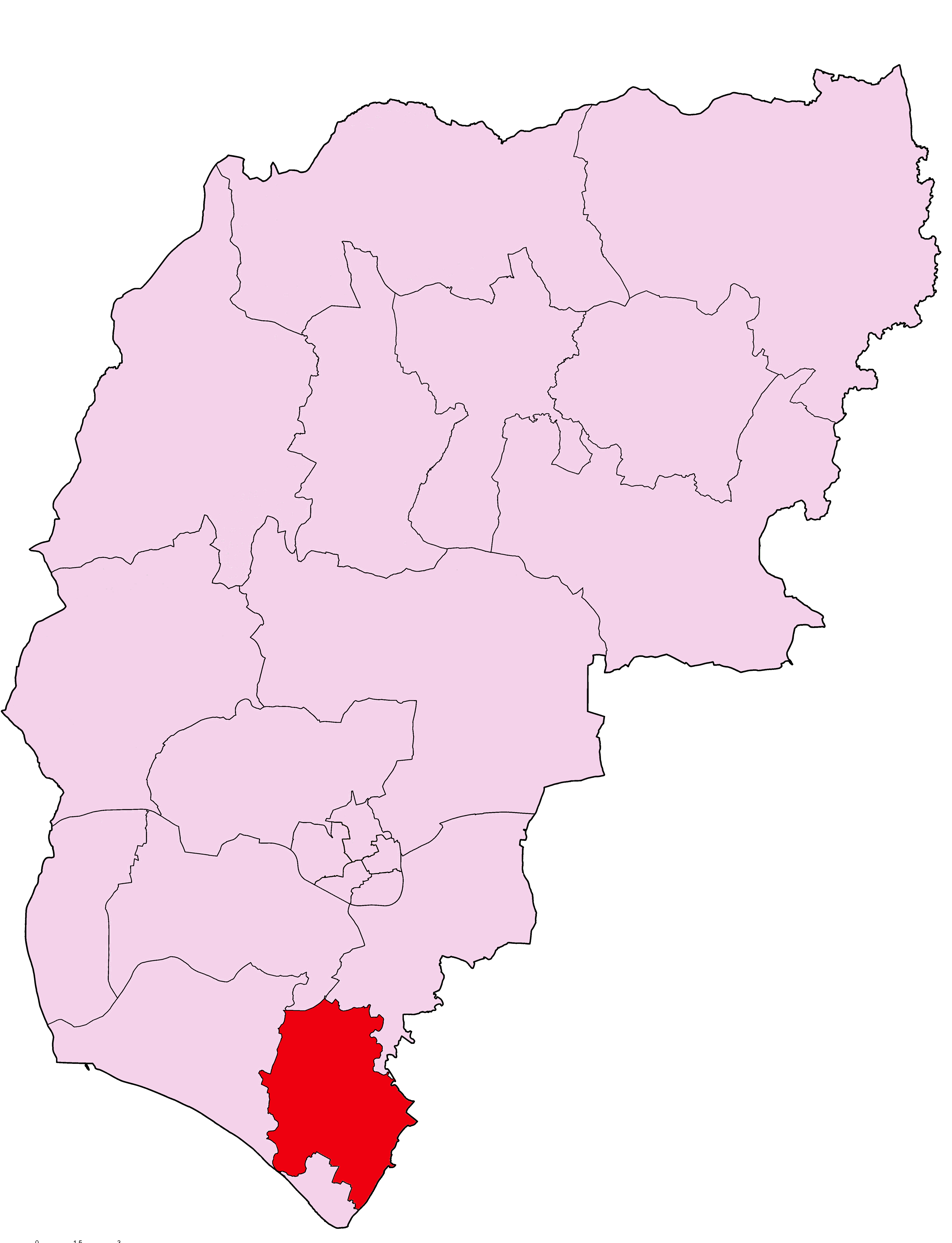
- Shown within Chichester
- Population: 4,731 (2019)
- District: Chichester
- Ceremonial county: West Sussex
- Country: England
- Sovereign state: United Kingdom
- UK Parliament: Chichester
- Councillors: Donna Johnson (LA); Linda Purnell (C)

Sidlesham with Selsey North is an electoral ward of Chichester District, West Sussex, England and returns two members to sit on Chichester District Council.

Following a district boundary review, Sidlesham with Selsey North was created from the Sidlesham and Selsey North wards in 2019.

== Councillors ==
Year	Member	Party	Member	Party
2019	Donna Johnson	Local Alliance	Linda Purnell	Conservative

== Election results ==
Chichester District Council Election 2019: Sidlesham with Selsey North
Party	Candidate	Votes	%	±%
Local Alliance	Donna Frances Johnson	717	28.2	
Conservative	Linda Caroline Purnell	648	25.5	
Conservative	Patricia Mary Tull	453	17.8	
Green	Lucinda Anne Gibson-House	436	17.1	
Liberal Democrats	Jane Mary Scotland	280	11.0	
Turnout		2,544	30.90	
Local Alliance gain from Conservative				
Conservative hold		Swing		

* Elected
