= Goodwood (ward) =

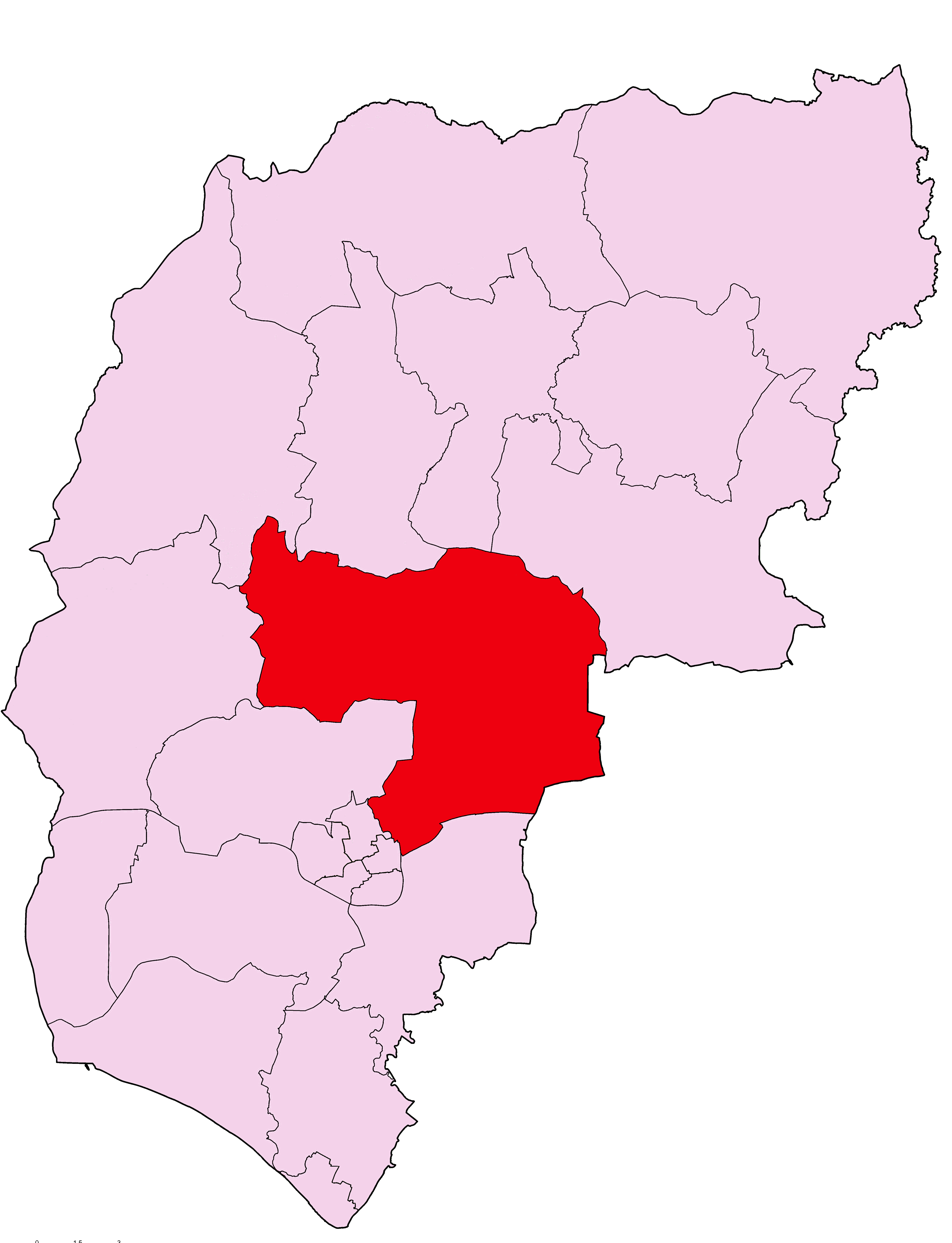
- Shown within Chichester
- Population: 2,478 (2019)
- District: Chichester
- Ceremonial county: West Sussex
- Country: England
- Sovereign state: United Kingdom
- UK Parliament: Chichester
- Councillors: Henry Potter (C)

Goodwood is an electoral ward of Chichester District, West Sussex, England and returns one member to sit on Chichester District Council.

Following a district boundary review, Goodwood was created from the Boxgrove and Lavant wards in 2019.

== Councillors ==
Year	Member	Party
2019	Henry Potter	Conservative

== Election results ==
Chichester District Council Election 2019: Goodwood
Party	Candidate	Votes	%	±%
Conservative	Henry Charles Potter	448	52.0	
Green	Philip Gerald Maber	212	24.6	
Liberal Democrats	Jack David Lovejoy	186	21.6	
Turnout		861	34.75	
Conservative hold		Swing		

* Elected
