= Tangmere (ward) =

- Shown within Chichester
- Population: 1,797 (2007)
- District: Chichester
- Ceremonial county: West Sussex
- Country: England
- Sovereign state: United Kingdom
- UK Parliament: Chichester

Tangmere was an electoral ward of Chichester District, West Sussex, England that returned one member to sit on Chichester District Council.

Following a district boundary review, it was merged into the new North Mundham and Tangmere ward in 2019.

== Councillor ==
Election	Member	Party
2007	Chris Punnett	Liberal Democrat

== Election results ==
Chichester District Council Election 2007: Tangmere
Party	Candidate	Votes	%	±%
Liberal Democrats	Chris Punnett*	335	51.38	
Conservative	Brenda Atlee	317	48.62	
Turnout		652	36.39	

* Elected
