= North Mundham and Tangmere =

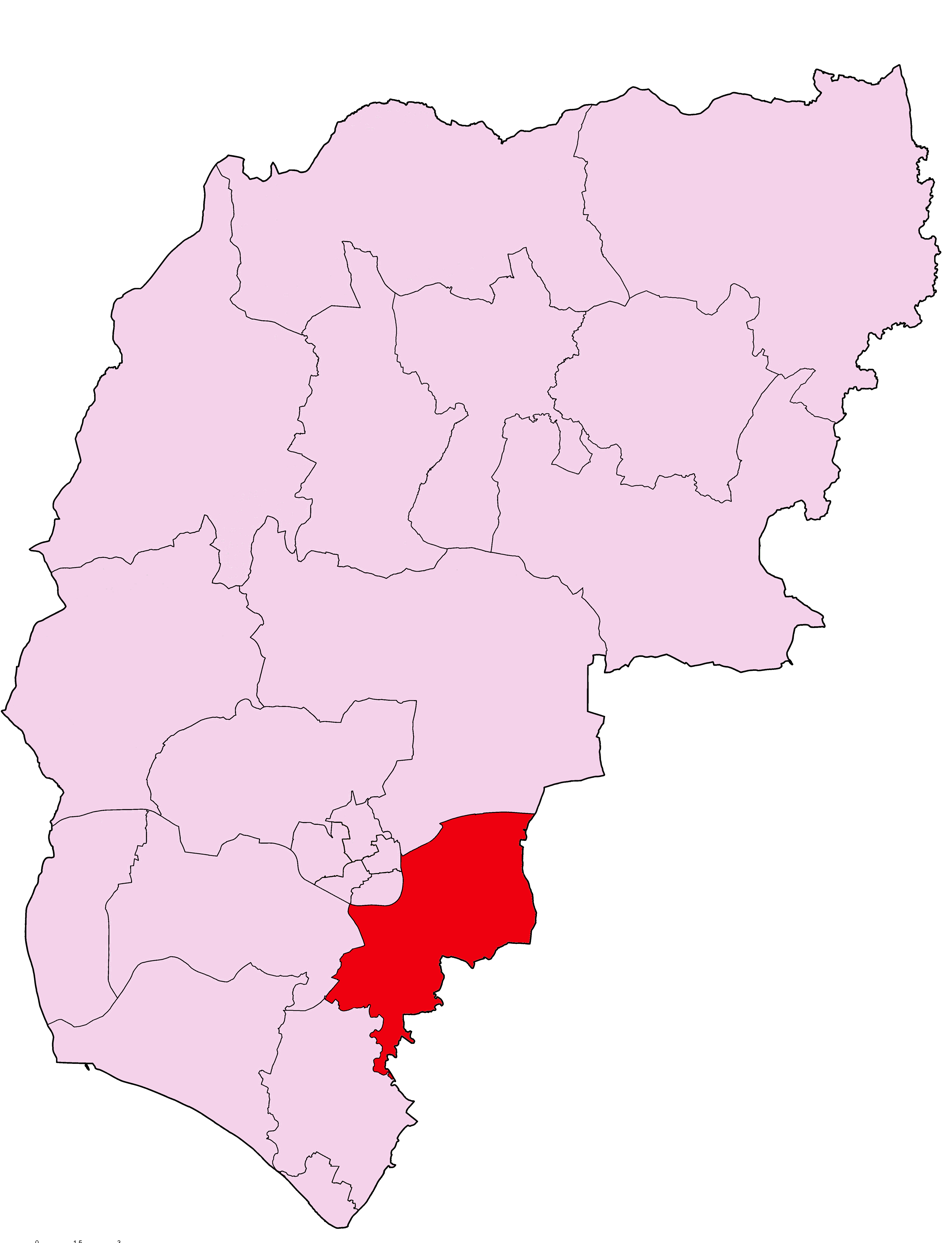
- Shown within Chichester
- Population: 5,109 (2019)
- District: Chichester
- Ceremonial county: West Sussex
- Country: England
- Sovereign state: United Kingdom
- UK Parliament: Chichester
- Councillors: Simon Oakley (C); Christopher Page (C)

North Mundham and Tangmere is an electoral ward of Chichester District, West Sussex, England and returns two members to sit on Chichester District Council.

Following a district boundary review, North Mundham and Tangmere was created from the North Mundham, Tangmere and Sidlesham wards in 2019.

== Councillors ==
Year	Member	Party	Member	Party
2019	Simon Oakley	Conservative	Christopher Page	Conservative

== Election results ==
Chichester District Council Election 2019: North Mundham and Tangmere
Party	Candidate	Votes	%	±%
Conservative	Simon John Oakley*	798	32.1	
Conservative	Christopher Leslie William Page*	691	28.1	
Liberal Democrats	David Betts	666	27.1	
UKIP	Andrew John Sheppard	289	11.8	
Turnout		2,456	30.88	
Conservative hold		Swing		
Conservative hold		Swing		

* Elected
