= Ifold =

Village in West Sussex, England

Coordinates: 51°04′08″N 0°32′31″W

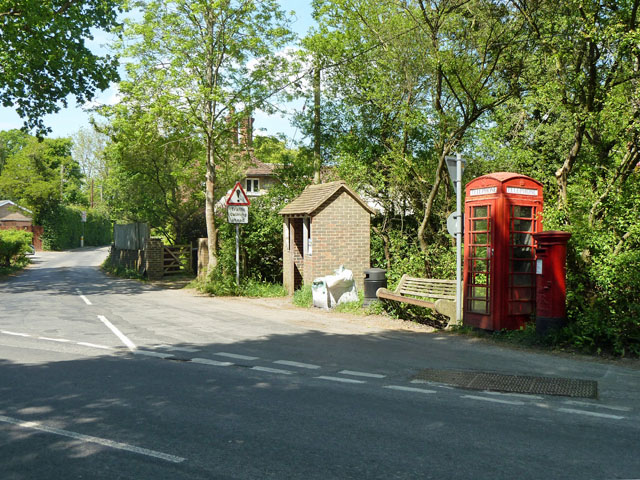
- Ifold

- Location within West Sussex
- OS grid reference: TQ 023 310
  - London: 35 miles (56 km) NNE
- Civil parish: Plaistow
- District: Chichester
- Shire county: West Sussex
- Region: South East
- Country: England
- Sovereign state: United Kingdom
- Post town: BILLINGSHURST
- Postcode district: RH14
- Dialling code: 01403
- Police: Sussex
- Fire: West Sussex
- Ambulance: South East Coast
- UK Parliament: Chichester

Ifold is a hamlet in West Sussex and part of the civil parish of Plaistow, of which it is the largest settlement. Ifold has a settlement boundary and for decades has had new housing development. Ifold, as it is today, arose from historic Ifold Estate with its manor house, Ifold House built in 1802 on the site of an original and demolished in 1936. During WWII plots of land were sold, originally to people who used them to build holiday or weekend homes.

Ifold has a community centre, Kelsey Hall. Originally a garage dating back to 1948, it has since been rebuilt and extended in the 1990s with the help of a lottery grant. The hall hosts a number of weekly user groups.

There is also a Scout Association which has Beavers, Cubs, Scouts, Brownies, Guides and Explorer Scouts. The Scout hut serves Ifold and the surrounding villages.

== History ==
The Ifold Estate was first divided into plots of land in the 1930s. Until around 1953 there was no mains water supply.

Plots of land were sold off from the main estate, typically in 1/3rd acre or 1/2 acre lots and individual properties were built. This gives Ifold a Sylvan feel compared to other neighbourhoods.

Over time, small lodging properties have been replaced with larger detached family dwellings often with 4 to 5 bedrooms.

There are approximately 400 properties on the estate today.

== Transport ==
Ifold lies on the 44 bus route of Arriva Bus and route 64 of the Compass Bus Company.
