= North Mundham (ward) =

- Shown within Chichester
- Population: 1,708 (2007)
- District: Chichester
- Ceremonial county: West Sussex
- Country: England
- Sovereign state: United Kingdom
- UK Parliament: Chichester
- Councillors: Stephen Quigley (Lib Dem)

North Mundham was an electoral ward of Chichester District, West Sussex, England that returned one member to sit on Chichester District Council.

Following a district boundary review, it was merged into the new North Mundham and Tangmere ward in 2019.

== Councillor ==
Election	Member	Party
2007	Stephen Quigley	Lib Dem

== Election results ==
Chichester District Council Election 2007: North Mundham
Party	Candidate	Votes	%	±%
Liberal Democrats	Stephen Quigley*	436	62.10	
Conservative	Jane Kilby	266	37.90	
Turnout		702	41.28	

* Elected
