= 2019 Chichester District Council election =

2019 UK local government election

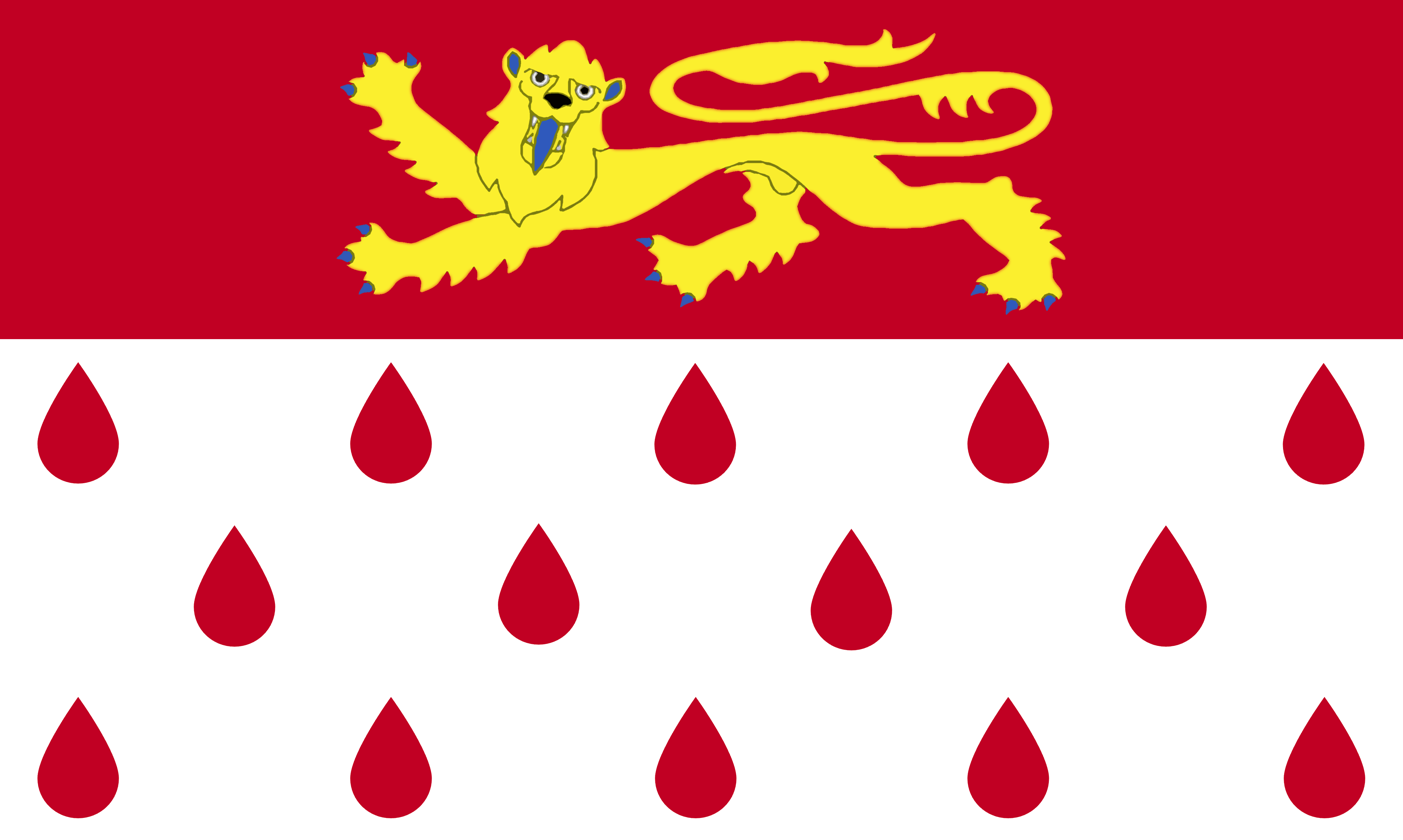
- 2 May 2019

All 36 seats to Chichester District Council 19 seats needed for a majority
	First party	Second party
Party	Conservative	Liberal Democrats
Seats before	38 (Note: Based on pre-2019 boundaries.)	5
Seats won	18	11
Seat change	▼10 (Note: Indicates boundary change—so this is a nominal figure.)	▲7
Popular vote	24,245	19,228
Percentage	42.0%	33.3%
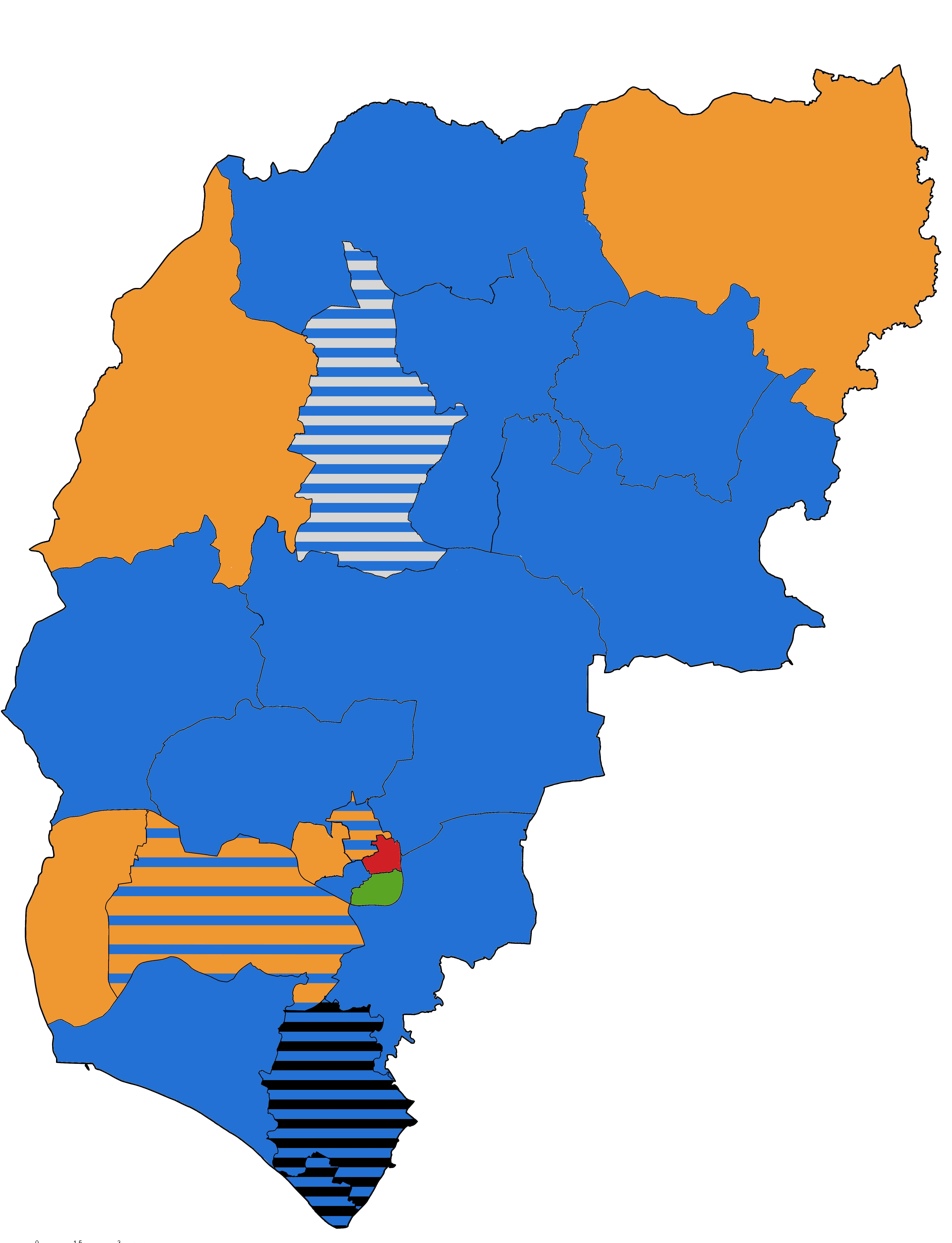
- Map showing the results of the 2019 Chichester District Council elections by ward.
Council control before election
Conservative
Council control after election
No overall control

Elections to Chichester District Council in West Sussex, United Kingdom were held on 2 May 2019. The whole council was up for election and the Conservative Party had its majority wiped out.

== Boundary changes ==
In 2016, the Local Government Boundary Commission for England presented its proposed boundary changes for the Chichester District, following a three-month consultation with the public. This involved reducing the number of councillors from 48 to 36, and the number of wards from 29 to 21.

Boundary changes in effect from May 2019
Old wards	New wards
Chichester East	Chichester Central‡
Chichester North	Chichester Central‡
Chichester South	Chichester Central‡
Chichester East	Chichester East
Chichester North	Chichester East
Chichester North	Chichester North
Chichester West	Chichester North
Chichester South	Chichester South
Chichester East	Chichester South
Chichester West	Chichester West
Chichester South	Chichester West
Easebourne	Easebourne
Stedham*	Easebourne
Fernhurst	Fernhurst
Plaistow*	Fernhurst
Rogate*	Fernhurst
Bury*	Fittleworth‡
Petworth	Fittleworth‡
Boxgrove*	Goodwood‡
Lavant	Goodwood‡
Bosham*	Harbour Villages‡
Donnington*	Harbour Villages‡
Fishbourne*	Harbour Villages‡
Southbourne	Harbour Villages‡
Harting	Harting
Rogate*	Harting
Lavant	Lavant
Funtington*	Lavant
Petworth	Loxwood‡
Plaistow*	Loxwood‡
Wisborough Green*	Loxwood‡
Midhurst	Midhurst
Stedham*	Midhurst
North Mundham*	North Mundham and Tangmere‡
Tangmere*	North Mundham and Tangmere‡
Sidlesham*	North Mundham and Tangmere‡
Petworth	Petworth
Selsey South	Selsey South
Selsey North*	Selsey South
Sidlesham*	Sidlesham with Selsey North‡
Selsey North*	Sidlesham with Selsey North‡
Southbourne	Southbourne
East Wittering*	The Witterings‡
West Wittering*	The Witterings‡
Westbourne	Westbourne
Funtington*	Westbourne
* Abolished	‡ New creation

== Summary ==
=== Election result ===
2019 Chichester District Council election
Party	Candidates	Seats	Gains	Losses	Net gain/loss	Seats %	Votes %	Votes	+/−
Conservative	36	18	1	11	▼10	50.0	42.0	24,245	–15.9
Liberal Democrats	31	11	7	0	▲7	30.6	33.3	19,228	+13.6
Green	9	2	2	0	▲2	5.6	8.4	4,878	+1.9
Labour	17	2	2	0	▲2	5.6	6.7	3,864	±0.0
Local Alliance	2	2	2	0	▲2	5.6	2.6	1,528	N/A
Independent	4	1	0	3	▼3	2.8	4.1	2,374	–2.3
UKIP	6	0	0	0	Steady	0.0	2.7	1,582	+0.1
Patria	1	0	0	0	Steady	0.0	0.1	84	±0.0

↓
18	11	2	2	2	1
Conservative	Liberal Democrats	Green	Labour	LA	I

== Ward results ==
Chichester Central (1 seat)
Party	Candidate	Votes	%	±%
Conservative	Martyn Bell	381	44.3	
Liberal Democrats	Anne Scicluna	353	40.1	
Labour	Malcolm Shepherd	108	12.5	
Turnout		861	38.46	
Conservative hold		Swing		

Chichester East (2 seats)
Party	Candidate	Votes	%	±%
Labour	Kevin Hughes	462	33.8	
Labour	Sarah Lishman	441	32.3	
Conservative	Christopher Spink	380	27.8	
Conservative	Jane Kilby	355	26.0	
Liberal Democrats	John Hughes	283	20.7	
Green	Pauline Gaskin	279	20.4	
Liberal Democrats	Michael Woolley	246	18.0	
UKIP	Terrence Walters	146	10.7	
Turnout		1,387	30.99	
Labour gain from Conservative		Swing		
Labour gain from Conservative		Swing		

Chichester North (2 seats)
Party	Candidate	Votes	%	±%
Liberal Democrats	Richard Plowman	625	38.4	
Conservative	Tony Dignum	623	38.3	
Conservative	Peter Budge	586	36.0	
Liberal Democrats	Julian Joy	560	34.4	
Green	Elizabeth Noble	490	30.1	
Labour	Theo Kent	219	13.5	
Turnout		1,650	38.76	
Liberal Democrats gain from Conservative		Swing		
Conservative hold		Swing		

Chichester South (2 seats)
Party	Candidate	Votes	%	±%
Green	Sarah Sharp	987	61.4	
Green	Heather Barrie	692	43.0	
Conservative	Jamie Fitzjohn	324	20.1	
Conservative	Nigel Galloway	321	20.0	
Liberal Democrats	Angus Bond	196	12.2	
Labour	Mandy Atkinson	187	11.6	
Labour	Philip Wilson	167	10.4	
Liberal Democrats	John Turbefield	160	10.0	
Turnout		1,630	31.74	
Green gain from Conservative		Swing		
Green gain from Conservative		Swing		

Chichester West (2 seats)
Party	Candidate	Votes	%	±%
Liberal Democrats	Clare Apel	1,139	55.8	
Liberal Democrats	John-Henry Bowden	890	43.6	
Conservative	Simon Lloyd-Williams	538	26.3	
Conservative	Stephen Hill	498	24.4	
Labour	James Hobson	228	11.2	
Labour	Aimie Merrett	216	10.6	
Independent	Michael Thorn	181	8.9	
UKIP	Michael Mason	177	8.7	
Patria	Andrew Emerson	84	4.1	
Turnout		2,062	42.71	
Liberal Democrats hold		Swing		
Liberal Democrats hold		Swing		

Easebourne (1 seat)
Party	Candidate	Votes	%	±%
Conservative	Erik Hobbs	536	63.7	
Liberal Democrats	Alexander Motley	287	34.1	
Turnout		841	35.93	
Conservative hold		Swing		

Fernhurst (2 seats)
Party	Candidate	Votes	%	±%
Conservative	Norma Graves	969	56.5	
Conservative	Peter Wilding	922	53.8	
Liberal Democrats	John Morton	690	40.2	
UKIP	Peter Pearce	227	13.2	
Turnout		1,736	34.35	
Conservative hold		Swing		
Conservative hold		Swing		

Fittleworth (1 seat)
Party	Candidate	Votes	%	±%
Conservative	Alan Sutton	661	66.8	
Liberal Democrats	Sean Cemm	302	30.5	
Turnout		990	38.70	
Conservative hold		Swing		

Goodwood (1 seat)
Party	Candidate	Votes	%	±%
Conservative	Henry Potter	448	52.0	
Green	Philip Maber	212	24.6	
Liberal Democrats	Jack Lovejoy	186	21.6	
Turnout		861	34.75	
Conservative hold		Swing		

Harbour Villages (3 seats)
Party	Candidate	Votes	%	±%
Liberal Democrats	Adrian Moss	1,739	52.0	
Liberal Democrats	David Rodgers	1,247	37.3	
Conservative	Penelope Plant	1,178	35.2	
Liberal Democrats	David Mackintosh	1,138	34.0	
Conservative	Andrew Collins	1,107	33.1	
Conservative	Michael Dicker	996	29.8	
Green	Michael Neville	961	28.7	
Labour	Jane Towers	329	9.8	
Labour	Stephen Gough	256	7.6	
Labour	Jane Turton	235	7.0	
Turnout		3,395	42.19	
Liberal Democrats hold		Swing		
Liberal Democrats gain from Conservative		Swing		
Conservative hold		Swing		

Harting (1 seat)
Party	Candidate	Votes	%	±%
Liberal Democrats	Kate O'Kelly	968	74.1	
Conservative	Lawrence Abel	313	23.9	
Turnout		1,307	45.22	
Liberal Democrats gain from Independent		Swing		

Lavant (1 seat)
Party	Candidate	Votes	%	±%
Conservative	David Palmer	531	58.4	
Liberal Democrats	Matthew Leeming	266	29.2	
Labour	Gwendoline Miles	94	10.3	
Turnout		910	36.01	
Conservative hold		Swing		

Loxwood (2 seats)
Party	Candidate	Votes	%	±%
Liberal Democrats	Natalie Hume	1,088	55.5	
Liberal Democrats	Gareth Evans	938	47.8	
Conservative	Christian Mahne	868	44.3	
Conservative	Christine Gibson-Pierce	781	39.8	
Turnout		2,017	36.56	
Liberal Democrats gain from Conservative		Swing		
Liberal Democrats gain from Conservative		Swing		

Midhurst (2 seats)
Party	Candidate	Votes	%	±%
Independent	Gordon McAra	1,280	59.8	
Liberal Democrats	Judith Fowler	666	31.1	
Conservative	Sally Watts	636	29.7	
Conservative	Nicholas Thomas	553	25.8	
Liberal Democrats	Caroline Neville	335	15.7	
Labour	Margaret Guest	227	10.6	
Turnout		2,150	38.21	
Independent hold		Swing		
Liberal Democrats gain from Independent		Swing		

North Mundham and Tangmere (2 seats)
Party	Candidate	Votes	%	±%
Conservative	Simon Oakley	798	51.0	
Conservative	Christopher Page	691	44.2	
Liberal Democrats	David Betts	666	42.6	
UKIP	Andrew Sheppard	289	18.5	
Turnout		1,576	30.88	
Conservative hold		Swing		
Conservative hold		Swing		

Petworth (1 seat)
Party	Candidate	Votes	%	±%
Conservative	Eileen Lintill	650	68.4	
Liberal Democrats	David Hares	172	26.5	
Labour	Jonathan Rodell	107	11.3	
Turnout		950	34.01	
Conservative hold		Swing		

Selsey South (2 seats)
Party	Candidate	Votes	%	±%
Local Alliance	Timothy Johnson	811	53.0	
Conservative	John Elliott	735	48.1	
Conservative	Roger Barrow	513	33.6	
Liberal Democrats	Simon Scotland	265	17.3	
Labour	Bridget Ash	147	9.6	
Labour	Mark Farwell	127	8.3	
Turnout		1,547	31.40	
Local Alliance gain from Conservative		Swing		
Conservative hold		Swing		

Sidlesham with Selsey North (2 seats)
Party	Candidate	Votes	%	±%
Local Alliance	Donna Johnson	717	49.4	
Conservative	Carol Purnell	648	44.6	
Conservative	Patricia Tull	453	31.2	
Green	Lucinda Gibson-House	436	30.0	
Liberal Democrats	Jane Scotland	280	19.3	
Turnout		1,462	30.90	
Local Alliance gain from Conservative		Swing		
Conservative hold		Swing		

Southbourne (2 seats)
Party	Candidate	Votes	%	±%
Liberal Democrats	Jonathan Brown	1,018	62.5	
Liberal Democrats	Tracie Bangert	884	54.2	
Conservative	Bob Hayes	674	41.3	
Conservative	Nigel Hogben	492	30.2	
Turnout		1,673		
Liberal Democrats hold		Swing		
Liberal Democrats gain from Conservative		Swing		

The Witterings (3 seats)
Party	Candidate	Votes	%	±%
Conservative	Graeme Barrett	1,309	44.8	
Conservative	Elizabeth Hamilton	1,191	40.7	
Conservative	Susan Taylor	1,003	34.3	
Liberal Democrats	Margaret Gormley	744	25.4	
Liberal Democrats	Susan Milnes	703	24.0	
Green	Stephanie Carn	592	20.2	
Independent	Laurence Pocock	577	19.7	
UKIP	Jonathan Bowman	396	13.5	
UKIP	Maureen Hunt	347	11.9	
Independent	Martin Silcocks	336	11.5	
Labour	Patrick O'Sullivan	314	10.7	
Turnout		2,948	36.58	
Conservative hold		Swing		
Conservative hold		Swing		
Conservative gain from Independent		Swing		

Westbourne (1 seat)
Party	Candidate	Votes	%	±%
Conservative	Roy Briscoe	583	57.4	
Green	Ann Stewart	229	22.6	
Liberal Democrats	Claire Power	194	19.1	
Turnout		1,015	37.89	
Conservative hold		Swing		

== Changes 2019–2023 ==
- By September 2019, Natalie Hume (Loxwood), elected as a Liberal Democrat, had left the party to join the Green group.
- On 28 September 2020, Conservative councillors Martyn Bell (Chichester Central) and Christopher Page (North Mundham & Tangmere) left the party to sit as independents.

=== By-elections ===
==== Loxwood ====
A by-election was held in Loxwood ward on 21 November 2019 after Green councillor Natalie Hume resigned on 30 September 2019. The Conservatives gained the seat from the Liberal Democrats.

Loxwood by-election: 21 November 2019
Party	Candidate	Votes	%	±%
Conservative	Janet Duncton	1,005	61.8	
Liberal Democrats	Alexander Jeffery	486	29.9	
Green	Francesca Sechi	126	7.7	
Patria	Andrew Emerson	9	0.6	
Majority		519	31.9	
Turnout		1,631	29.36	
Rejected ballots		5	0.3	
Conservative gain from Liberal Democrats		Swing		

==== Chichester East ====
A by-election was held in Chichester East ward on 24 June 2021 after Labour councillor Kevin Hughes resigned. The Liberal Democrats gained the seat from Labour.

Chichester East by-election: 24 June 2021
Party	Candidate	Votes	%	±%
Liberal Democrats	Bill Brisbane	430	43.0	
Conservative	Jane Kilby	310	31.0	
Labour	Clare Walsh	261	26.1	
Majority		120	12.0	
Turnout		1,005	21.2	
Rejected ballots		4	0.4	
Registered electors		4,741		
Liberal Democrats gain from Labour		Swing		
