= Selsey North =

- Shown within Chichester
- Population: 5,215 (2007)
- District: Chichester
- Ceremonial county: West Sussex
- Country: England
- Sovereign state: United Kingdom
- UK Parliament: Chichester

Selsey North was an electoral ward of Chichester District, West Sussex, England that returned three members to sit on Chichester District Council.

Following a district boundary review, it was split between the new Sidlesham with Selsey North ward and existing Selsey South ward in 2019.

== Councillors ==
| Year | Member | Party | Member | Party | Member | Party |
|---|---|---|---|---|---|---|
| 2007 | Melva Bateman | Conservative | John Connor | Conservative | Bev Tinson | Conservative |

== Election results ==
Chichester District Council Election 2007: Selsey North
| Party | Candidate | Votes | % | ±% |
|---|---|---|---|---|
| Conservative | Melva Bateman* | 880 | 15.77 | |
| Conservative | John Charles Patrick Connor* | 835 | 14.97 | |
| Conservative | Bev Tinson* | 796 | 14.26 | |
| Independent | Kenneth Frederick George Codd | 554 | 9.92 | |
| Independent | Dee Caldwell | 496 | 8.88 | |
| Independent | Linda Irene Bowman | 494 | 8.85 | |
| Liberal Democrats | Jacq Cook | 376 | 6.74 | |
| Liberal Democrats | Jane-Marie McQueen | 300 | 5.38 | |
| Liberal Democrats | Libby Kendall | 274 | 4.91 | |
| UKIP | Andrew Edward Wilkinson | 174 | 3.12 | |
| Labour | Margaret Dyer | 147 | 2.63 | |
| Labour | Sidney William Arthur Hoy | 134 | 2.40 | |
| Labour | Micheline Margaret Lawson | 121 | 2.17 | |
| Total votes | | 5581 | | |
| Turnout | | 1989 | 38.24 | |

* Elected
