= Fittleworth (ward) =

Electoral ward in West Sussex, England

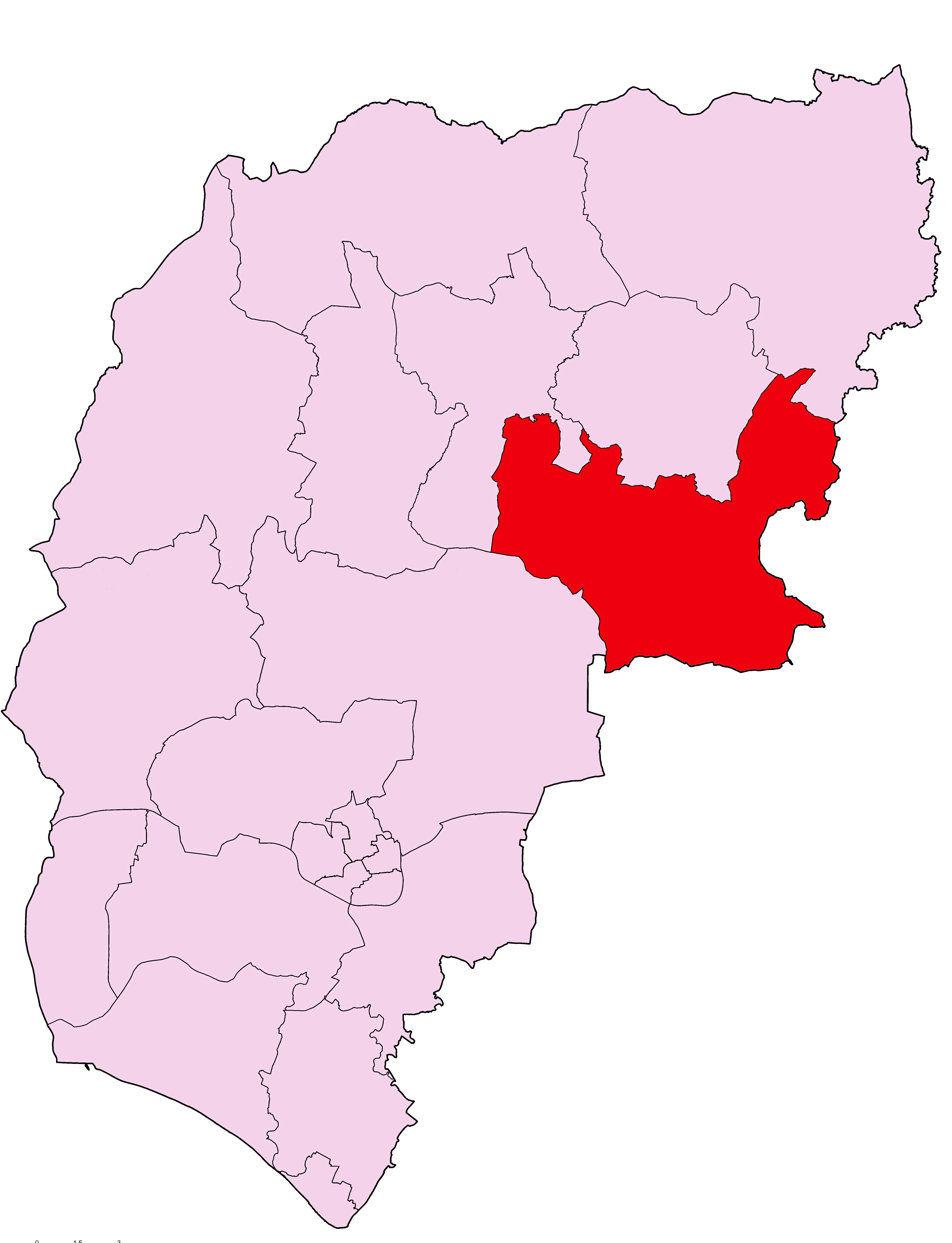
- Shown within Chichester
- Population: 2,558 (2019)
- District: Chichester
- Ceremonial county: West Sussex
- Country: England
- Sovereign state: United Kingdom
- UK Parliament: Chichester
- Councillors: Alan Sutton (C)

Fernhurst is an electoral ward of Chichester District, West Sussex, England and returns one member to sit on Chichester District Council.

Following a district boundary review, Fittleworth was created from the Bury and Petworth wards in 2019.

== Councillors ==
| Year | Member | Party |
|---|---|---|
| 2019 | Alan Sutton | Conservative |

== Election results ==
Chichester District Council Election 2019: Fittleworth
| Party | Candidate | Votes | % | ±% |
|---|---|---|---|---|
| Conservative | Alan James Franklin Sutton* | 661 | 66.8 | |
| Liberal Democrats | Sean Anton Cemm | 302 | 30.5 | |
| Turnout | | 990 | 38.70 | |
| Conservative hold | | Swing | | |

* Elected
