= Wisborough Green (ward) =

- Shown within Chichester
- District: Chichester
- Ceremonial county: West Sussex
- Country: England
- Sovereign state: United Kingdom
- UK Parliament: Arundel and South Downs

Wisborough Green was an electoral ward of Chichester District, West Sussex, England that returned one member to sit on Chichester District Council.

Following a district boundary review, it was merged into the new Loxwood ward in 2019.

== Councillor ==
| Election | Member | Party |
|---|---|---|
| 2015 | Josef J L T Ransley | Conservative |

== Election results ==
Chichester District Council Election 7 May 2015: Wisborough Green
| Party | Candidate | Votes | % | ±% |
|---|---|---|---|---|
| Conservative | Josef John Thomas Leopold Ransley | 1051 | | |
| Green | Catherine (Katy) Brigit Fletcher | 273 | | |
| Liberal Democrats | Roger Wood | 188 | | |
| Turnout | | 1523 | 74.18% | |

* Elected unopposed

Chichester District Council Election 2007: Wisborough Green
| Party | Candidate | Votes | % | ±% |
|---|---|---|---|---|
| Conservative | Bob Field* | | | |
| Turnout | | | | |

* Elected unopposed
