= Petworth (ward) =

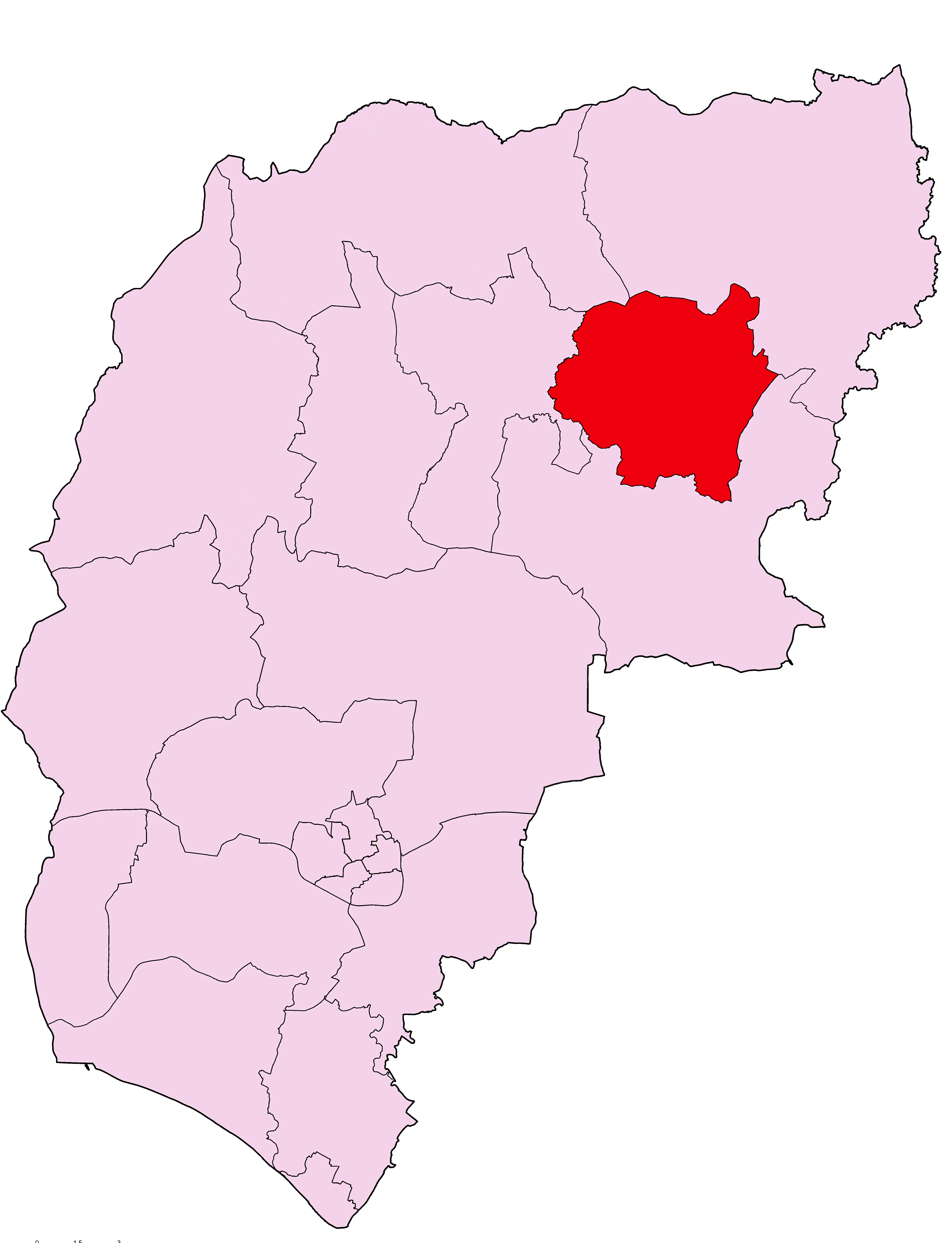
- Shown within Chichester
- Population: 2,794 (2019)
- District: Chichester
- Ceremonial county: West Sussex
- Country: England
- Sovereign state: United Kingdom
- UK Parliament: Arundel and South Downs
- Councillors: Eileen Lintill (C)

Petworth is an electoral ward of Chichester District, West Sussex, England and returns one member to sit on Chichester District Council.

Following a district boundary review, part of the previous Petworth boundaries were split into the new Fittleworth and Loxwood wards in 2019.

== Councillors ==
Year	Member	Party	Member	Party
2019	Eileen Lintill	Conservative		
2007	Eileen Lintill	Conservative	Janet Duncton	Conservative

== Election results ==
Chichester District Council Election 2019: Petworth
Party	Candidate	Votes	%	±%
Conservative	Eileen Patricia Lintill*	650	68.4	
Liberal Democrats	David Clifford Hares	172	26.5	
Labour	Jonathan Michael Rodell	107	11.3	
Turnout		950	34.01	
Conservative hold		Swing		

Chichester District Council Election 2007: Petworth
Party	Candidate	Votes	%	±%
Conservative	Janet Elizabeth Duncton*	1053	39.06	
Conservative	Eileen Lintill*	952	35.31	
Liberal Democrats	Liz Jenkins	373	13.84	
Liberal Democrats	Catherine Gillian Alderson Perschke	318	11.79	
Total votes		2696		
Turnout		1446	38.18	

* Elected
