= Funtington (ward) =

- Shown within Chichester
- Population: 2,153 (2007)
- District: Chichester
- Ceremonial county: West Sussex
- Country: England
- Sovereign state: United Kingdom
- UK Parliament: Chichester

Funtington was an electoral ward of Chichester District, West Sussex, England that returned one member to sit on Chichester District Council.

Following a district boundary review, it was split between the Westbourne and Lavant wards in 2019.

== Councillor ==
Election	Member	Party
2007	Julie Tassell	Conservative

== Election results ==
Chichester District Council Election 2007: Funtington
Party	Candidate	Votes	%	±%
Conservative	Julie Tassell*	726	76.42	
Liberal Democrats	John Rankin	224	23.58	
Turnout		950	44.36	

* Elected
