= Stedham (ward) =

- Shown within Chichester
- Population: 1,820 (2007)
- District: Chichester
- Ceremonial county: West Sussex
- Country: England
- Sovereign state: United Kingdom
- UK Parliament: Chichester

Stedham was an electoral ward of Chichester District, West Sussex, England that returned one member to sit on Chichester District Council.

Following a district boundary review, it was split between the Easebourne and Midhurst wards in 2019.

== Councillor ==
Election	Member	Party
2007	John Cherry	Independent

== Election results ==
Chichester District Council Election 2007: Stedham
Party	Candidate	Votes	%	±%
Conservative	John Cherry*	659	80.27	
Liberal Democrats	Teresa Eleanor Campbell	162	19.73	
Turnout		821	45.22	

* Elected
