= Bury (ward) =

- Shown within Chichester
- Population: 1,798 (2007)
- District: Chichester
- Ceremonial county: West Sussex
- Country: England
- Sovereign state: United Kingdom
- UK Parliament: Chichester

Bury was an electoral ward of Chichester District, West Sussex, England that returned one member to sit on Chichester District Council.

Following a district boundary review, it was merged into the new Fittleworth ward in 2019.

== Councillor ==
Election	Member	Party
2007	Susan Wade Weeks	Conservative
2008	John Elliott	Conservative

== Election results ==
Bury By Election 2008: Bury
Party	Candidate	Votes	%	±%
Conservative	John Francis Elliott*	431	69.20	+13.91
Liberal Democrats	David Hares	191	30.8	n/a
Turnout		622	34.40	−10.15
Conservative hold		Swing	+13.91	

* Elected

Chichester District Council Election 2007: Bury
Party	Candidate	Votes	%	±%
Conservative	Susan Eileen Wade Weeks*	439	55.29	
Independent	Susan Mary Hallock	355	44.71	
Turnout		794	44.55	

* Elected
