= Boxgrove (ward) =

Former electoral ward in West Sussex, England

- Shown within Chichester
- Population: 1,738 (2007)
- District: Chichester
- Ceremonial county: West Sussex
- Country: England
- Sovereign state: United Kingdom
- UK Parliament: Chichester

Boxgrove was an electoral ward of Chichester District, West Sussex, England that returned one member to sit on Chichester District Council.

Following a district boundary review, it was merged into the new Goodwood ward in 2019.

== Councillor ==
Election	Member	Party
2007	Henry Potter	Conservative

== Election results ==
Chichester District Council Election 2007: Boxgrove
Party	Candidate	Votes	%	±%
Conservative	Henry Potter*	559	68.25	
Liberal Democrats	Jake Wright	260	31.75	
Turnout		819	47.41	

* Elected
