= Westbourne (Chichester ward) =

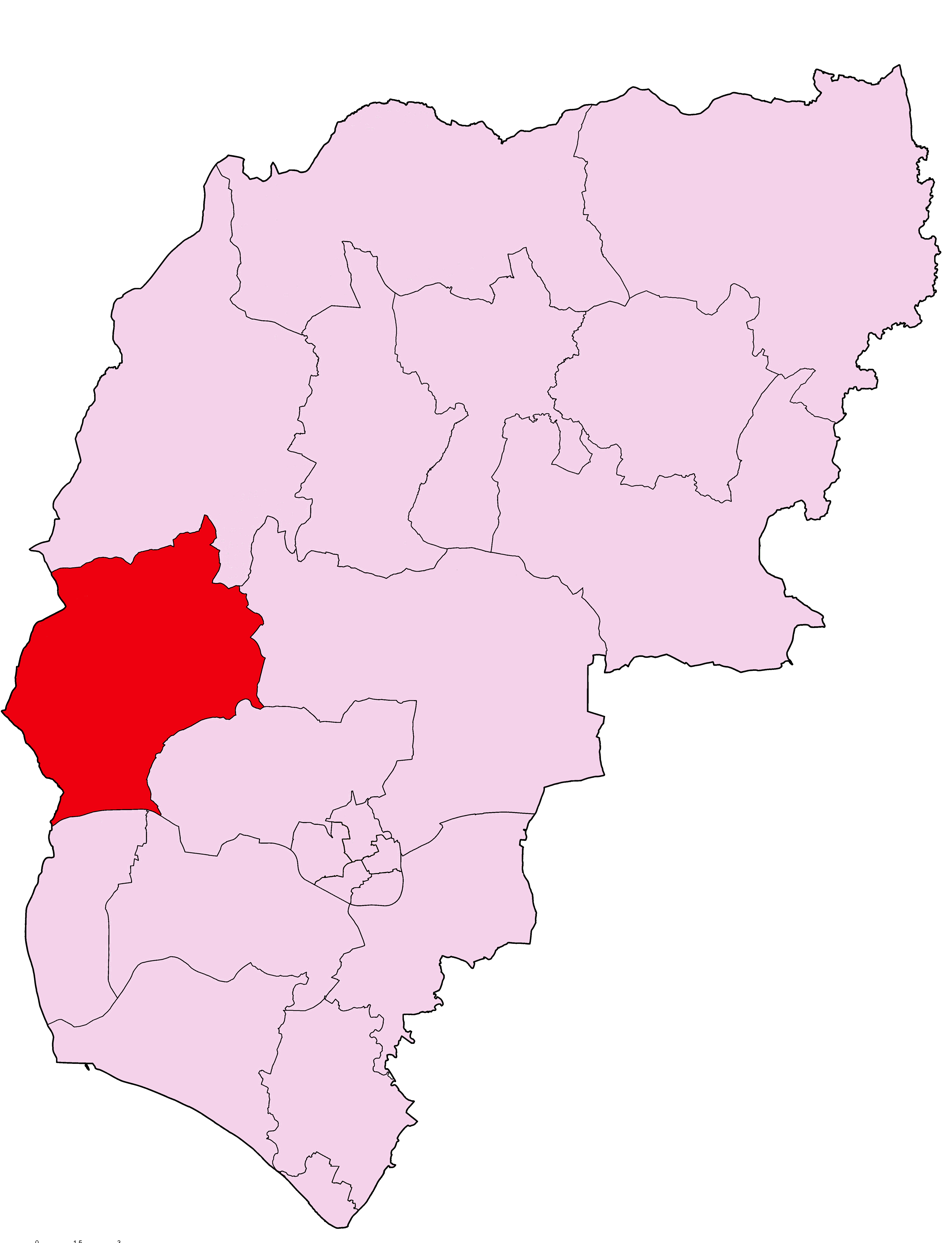
- Shown within Chichester
- Population: 2,676 (2019)
- District: Chichester
- Ceremonial county: West Sussex
- Country: England
- Sovereign state: United Kingdom
- UK Parliament: Chichester
- Councillors: Roy Briscoe (C)

Westbourne is an electoral ward of Chichester District, West Sussex, England, named for the local village of Westbourne, and returns one member to sit on Chichester District Council.

Following a district boundary review, the former ward of Funtington was split and merged into Westbourne in 2019.

== Councillor ==
Election	Member	Party
2019	Roy Briscoe	Conservative
2013	Mark Dunn	Conservative
2007	Maureen Elliott	Conservative

== Election results ==
Chichester District Council Election 2019: Westbourne
Party	Candidate	Votes	%	±%
Conservative	Roy Alan Briscoe*	583	57.4	
Green	Ann Elizabeth Stewart	229	22.6	
Liberal Democrats	Claire Louise Power	194	19.1	
Turnout		1,015	37.89	
Conservative hold		Swing		

Chichester District Council Election 2007: Westbourne
Party	Candidate	Votes	%	±%
Conservative	Maureen Eleanor Elliott*	445	72.12	
Liberal Democrats	Stephanie Myra Cecil	172	27.88	
Turnout		617	36.36	

* Elected
