= Easebourne (ward) =

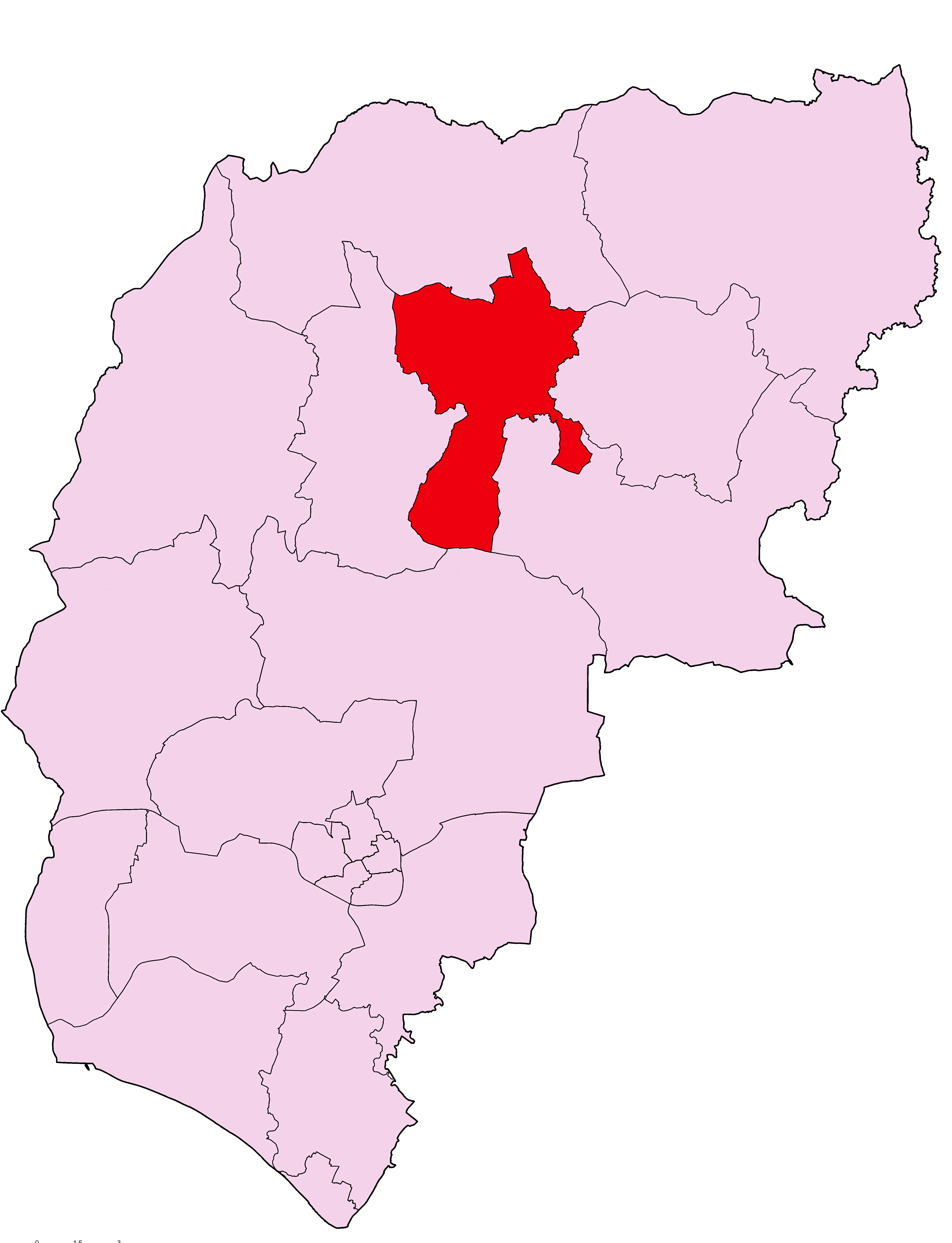
- Shown within Chichester
- Population: 1,890 (2007)
- District: Chichester
- Ceremonial county: West Sussex
- Country: England
- Sovereign state: United Kingdom
- UK Parliament: Chichester
- Councillors: Hobbs (C)

Easebourne is an electoral ward of Chichester District, West Sussex, England and returns one member to sit on Chichester District Council.

Following a district boundary review, the former ward of Stedham was split and merged into Easebourne in 2019.

== Councillor ==
Election	Member	Party
2019	Francis Hobbs	Conservative
2007	Elizabeth Hamilton	Conservative

== Election results ==
Chichester District Council Election 2019: Easebourne
Party	Candidate	Votes	%	±%
Conservative	Francis Hobbs*	536	63.7	
Liberal Democrats	Alexander Gordon Motley	287	34.1	
Turnout		841	35.93	
Conservative hold		Swing		

Chichester District Council Election 2007: Easebourne
Party	Candidate	Votes	%	±%
Conservative	Elizabeth Hamilton*	576	78.37	
Liberal Democrats	Arely Green	159	21.63	
Turnout		735	38.99	

* Elected
