= Rogate (ward) =

- Shown within Chichester
- Population: 2,012 (2007)
- District: Chichester
- Ceremonial county: West Sussex
- Country: England
- Sovereign state: United Kingdom
- UK Parliament: Chichester
- Councillors: Nigel Johnson-Hill (Con)

Rogate was an electoral ward of Chichester District, West Sussex, England that returned one member to sit on Chichester District Council.

Following a district boundary review, it was split between the Fernhurst and Harting wards in 2019.

== Councillor ==
| Election | Member | Party |
|---|---|---|
| 2007 | William Mason | Conservative |
| 2010 | Nigel Johnson-Hill | Conservative |

== Election results ==
Rogate By Election 2010
| Party | Candidate | Votes | % | ±% |
|---|---|---|---|---|
| Conservative | Nigel Johnson-Hill* | | | |
| Turnout | | | | |

* Elected unopposed

Chichester District Council Election 2007: Rogate
| Party | Candidate | Votes | % | ±% |
|---|---|---|---|---|
| Conservative | William Ernest Delacour Mason* | 695 | 73.16 | |
| Liberal Democrats | Kevin George Campbell | 255 | 26.84 | |
| Turnout | | 950 | 47.37 | |

* Elected
