= Loxwood (ward) =

Electoral ward in West Sussex, England

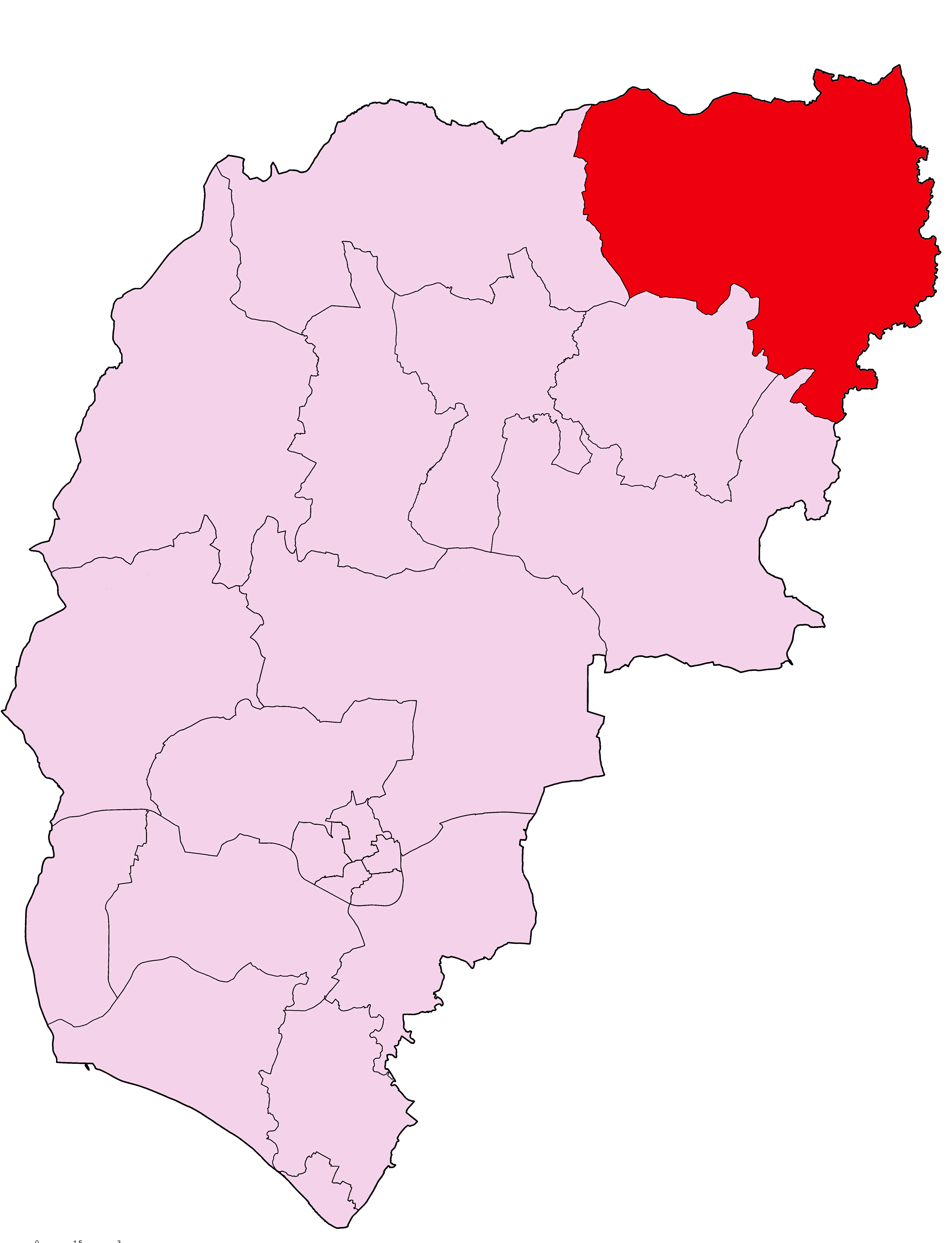
- Shown within Chichester
- Population: 5,517 (2019)
- District: Chichester
- Ceremonial county: West Sussex
- Country: England
- Sovereign state: United Kingdom
- UK Parliament: Arundel and South Downs Chichester
- Councillors: Janet Duncton (C); Gareth Evans (LD)

Loxwood is an electoral ward of Chichester District, West Sussex, England and returns two members to sit on Chichester District Council.

Following a district boundary review, Loxwood was created from the Petworth, Plaistow and Wisborough Green wards in 2019.

== Councillors ==
Year	Member	Party	Member	Party
May 2023	Charles Todhunter	Liberal Democrat	Gareth Evans	Liberal Democrat
May 2019	Natalie Hume	Liberal Democrat	Gareth Evans	Liberal Democrat
July 2019^{[a]}	Natalie Hume	Green	Gareth Evans	Liberal Democrat
Nov 2019	Janet Duncton	Conservative	Gareth Evans	Liberal Democrat

== Election results ==
Chichester District Council Election 2023
Party	Candidate	Votes	%	±%
Liberal Democrats	Gareth Benjamin Evans*	1,805	39.2	+10
Liberal Democrats	Charles Nicholas Kenneth Todhunter*	1,556	33.8	+8.7
Conservative	Paul North	711	15.4	−7.9
Conservative	Steven Gerald Waight	530	11.5	−9.4
Turnout		4,602	42.8	+6.24
Liberal Democrats hold				
Liberal Democrats hold				

Chichester District Council By-Election 21 November 2019: Loxwood
Party	Candidate	Votes	%	±%
Conservative	Janet Elizabeth Duncton*	1,005	61.6	▲17.4
Liberal Democrats	Alexander Miles Jeffery	486	29.8	▼24.5
Green	Francesca Sechi	126	7.7	New
Patria	Andrew Emerson	9	0.5	New
Turnout		1,631	29.36	▼7.2
Conservative gain from Green		Swing		

Chichester District Council Election 2019: Loxwood
Party	Candidate	Votes	%	±%
Liberal Democrats	Natalie Cecilia Hume*	1,088	29.2	
Liberal Democrats	Gareth Benjamin Evans*	938	25.1	
Conservative	Christian Nicholas Mahne	868	23.3	
Conservative	Christine Victoria Gibson-Pierce	781	20.9	
Turnout		3,731	36.56	
Liberal Democrats gain from Conservative		Swing		
Liberal Democrats gain from Conservative		Swing		

* Elected

== Notes ==
- Defected to the Greens on 30 July 2019.
