= Harting (ward) =

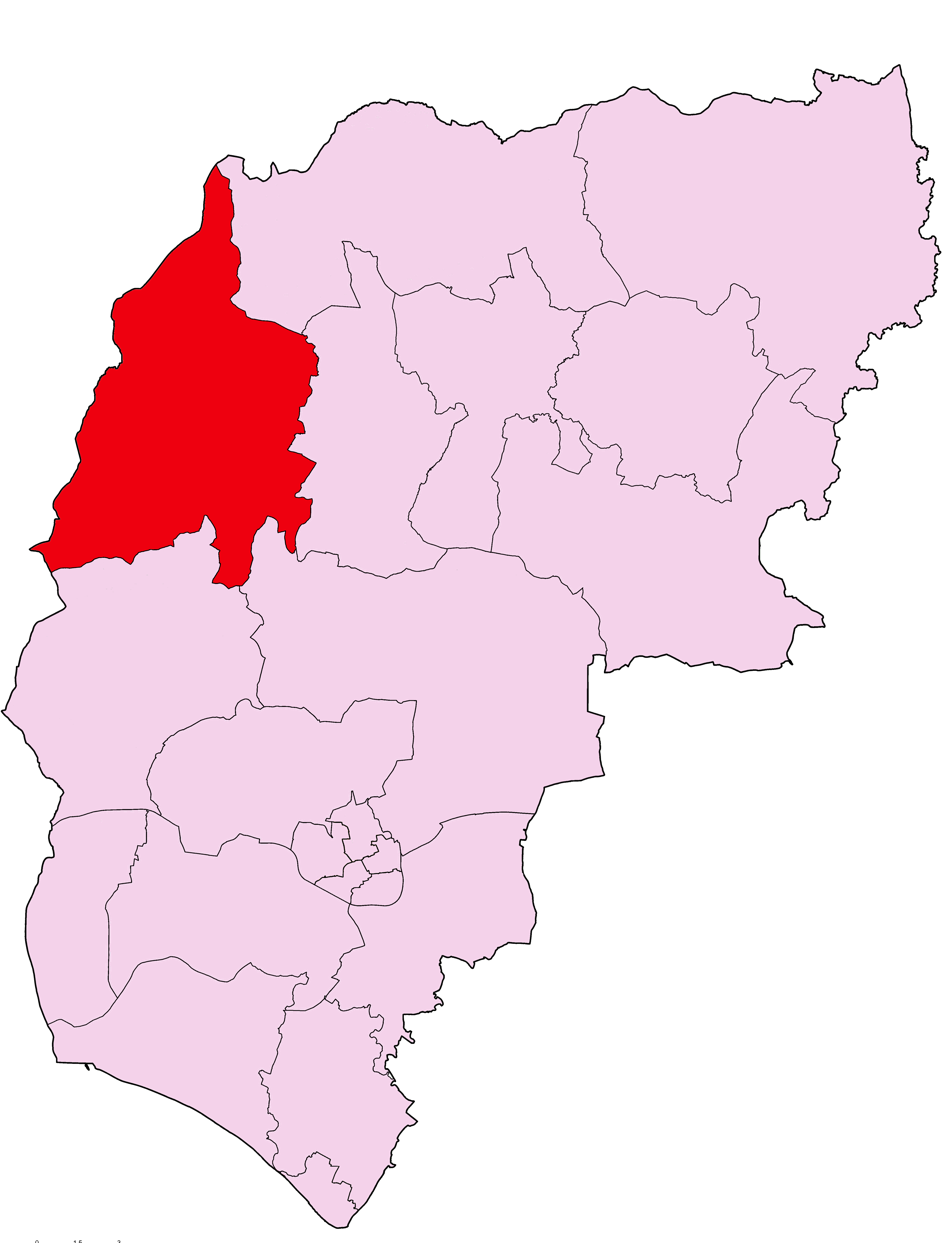
- Shown within Chichester
- Population: 2,890 (2019)
- District: Chichester
- Ceremonial county: West Sussex
- Country: England
- Sovereign state: United Kingdom
- UK Parliament: Chichester
- Councillors: Kate O'Kelly (LD)

Harting is an electoral ward of Chichester District, West Sussex, England and returns one member to sit on Chichester District Council.

Following a district boundary review, the former ward of Rogate was split and merged into Harting in 2019.

== Councillor ==
| Election | Member | Party |
|---|---|---|
| 2019 | Kate O'Kelly | Liberal Democrat |
| 2007 | Andrew Shaxson | Independent |

== Election results ==
Chichester District Council Election 2019: Harting
| Party | Candidate | Votes | % | ±% |
|---|---|---|---|---|
| Liberal Democrats | Kate Francesca Bacon O'Kelly* | 968 | 74.1 | |
| Conservative | Lawrence Vere Tristram Abel | 313 | 23.9 | |
| Turnout | | 1,307 | 45.22 | |
| Liberal Democrats gain from Independent | | Swing | | |

Chichester District Council Election 2007: Harting
| Party | Candidate | Votes | % | ±% |
|---|---|---|---|---|
| Independent | Andrew Shaxson* | 609 | 72.41 | |
| Conservative | Sarah Elizabeth Baker | 232 | 27.59 | |
| Turnout | | 841 | 49.71 | |

* Elected
