= Sidlesham (ward) =

- Shown within Chichester
- Population: 1,581 (2007)
- District: Chichester
- Ceremonial county: West Sussex
- Country: England
- Sovereign state: United Kingdom
- UK Parliament: Chichester

Sidlesham was an electoral ward of Chichester District, West Sussex, England that returned one member to sit on Chichester District Council.

Following a district boundary review, it was split between the new Sidlesham with Selsey North and North Mundham and Tangmere wards in 2019.

== Councillor ==
Election	Member	Party
2007	Tricia Tull	Conservative

== Election results ==
Chichester District Council Election 2007: Sidlesham
Party	Candidate	Votes	%	±%
Conservative	Tricia Tull*	393	53.76	
Liberal Democrats	Diana Pound	338	46.24	
Turnout		731	40.03	

* Elected
