= Lavant (ward) =

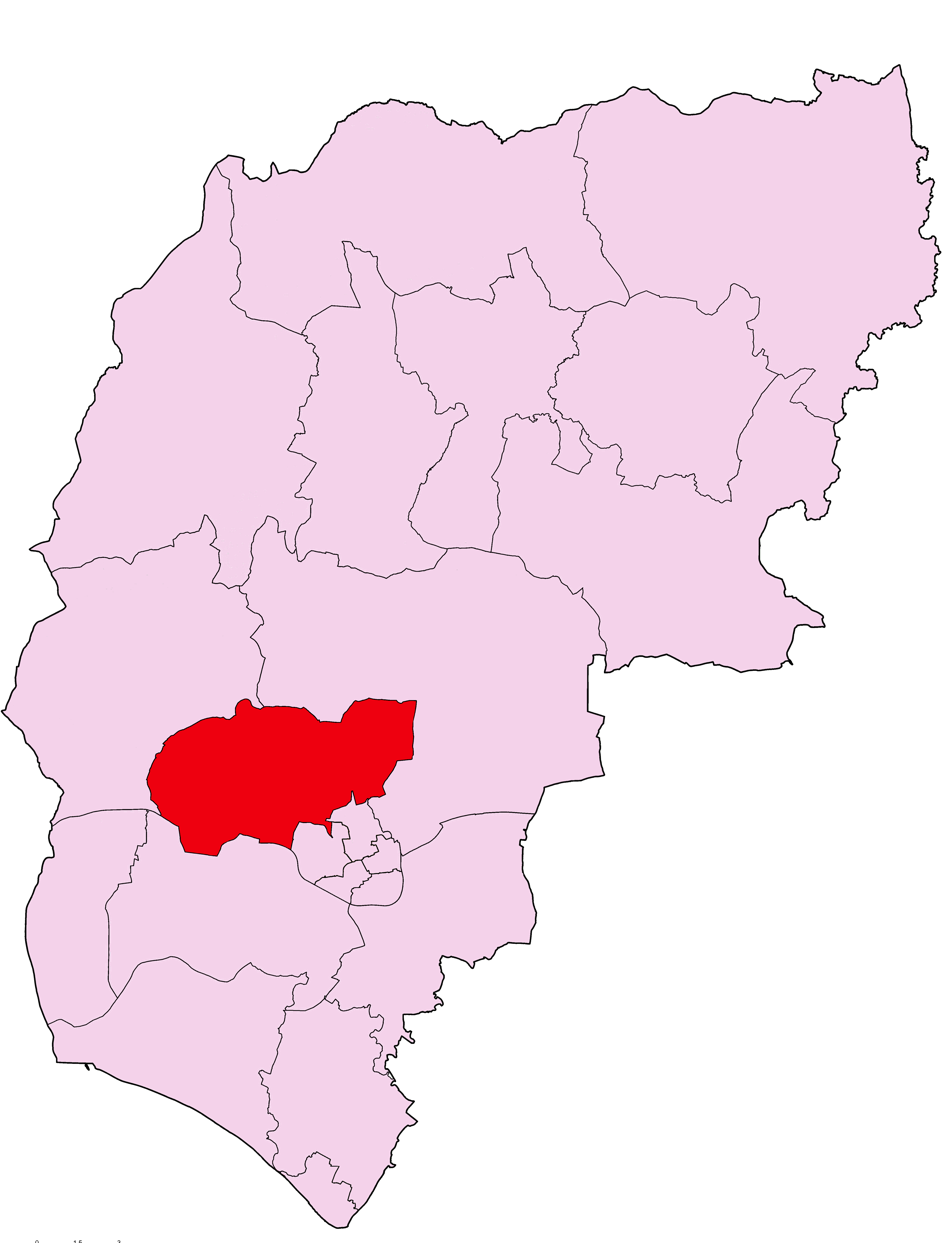
- Shown within Chichester
- Population: 1,669 (2007)
- District: Chichester
- Ceremonial county: West Sussex
- Country: England
- Sovereign state: United Kingdom
- UK Parliament: Chichester
- Councillors: David Palmer (C)

Lavant is an electoral ward of Chichester District, West Sussex, England and returns one member to sit on Chichester District Council.

Following a district boundary review, the former ward of Funtington was split and merged into Lavant in 2019. Part of the previous Lavant boundaries were also split into the new Goodwood ward.

== Councillor ==
Election	Member	Party
2019	David Palmer	Conservative
2015	Mike N Hall	Conservative
2007	Andrew Smith	Liberal Democrat

== Election results ==
Chichester District Council Election 2019: Lavant
Party	Candidate	Votes	%	±%
Conservative	David Erroll Prior Palmer*	531	58.4	
Liberal Democrats	Matthew John Leeming	266	29.2	
Labour	Gwendoline Jane Miles	94	10.3	
Turnout		910	36.01	
Conservative hold		Swing		

Chichester District Council Election 2007: Lavant
Party	Candidate	Votes	%	±%
Liberal Democrats	Andrew Robert Homan Smith*	362	59.74	
Conservative	John Elliott	244	40.26	
Turnout		606	36.55	

* Elected
