= Chichester South (ward) =

Electoral ward of West Sussex, England

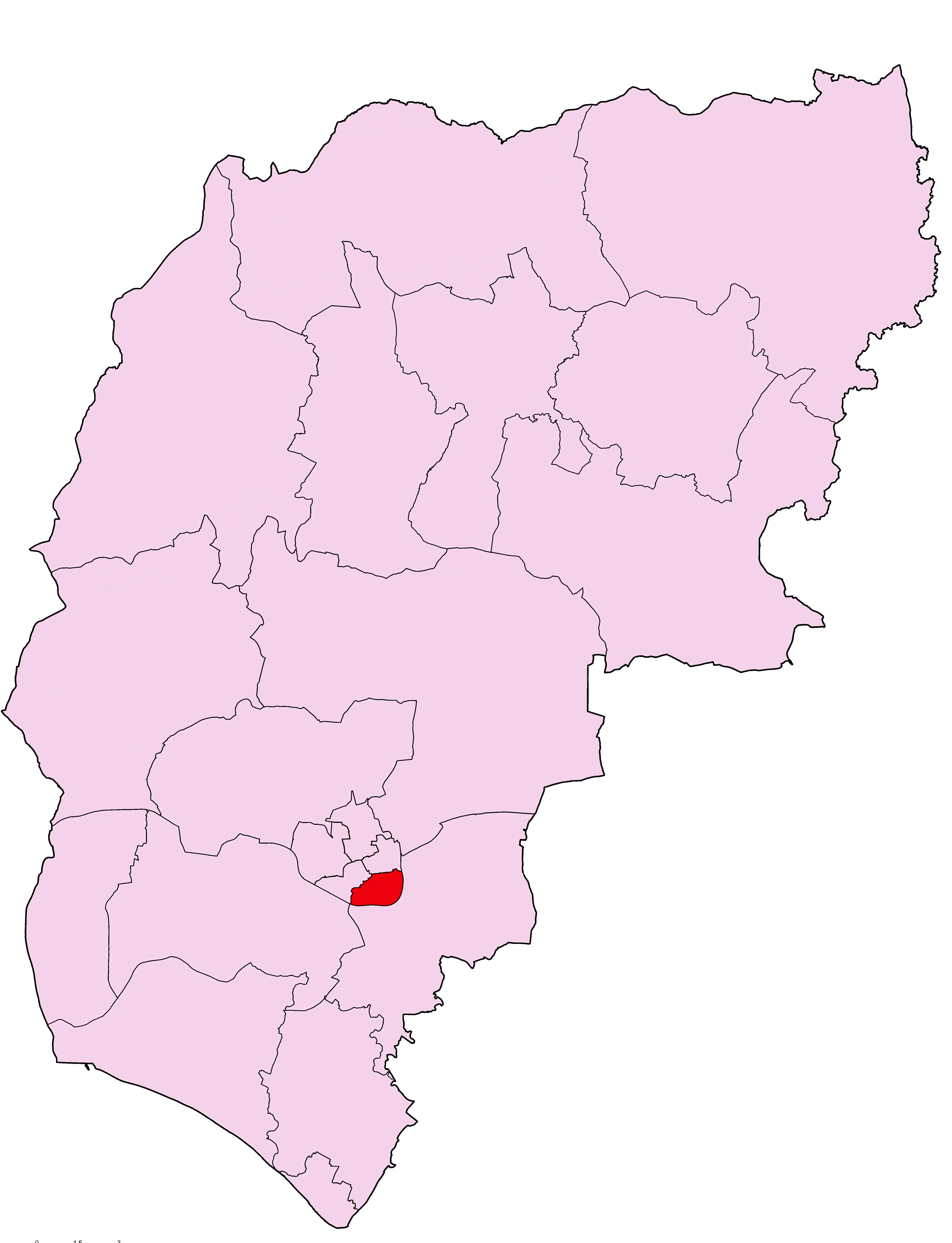
- Shown within Chichester
- Population: 5,049 (2007)
- District: Chichester
- Ceremonial county: West Sussex
- Country: England
- Sovereign state: United Kingdom
- UK Parliament: Chichester
- Councillors: Sarah Sharp (G); Heather Barrie (G)

Chichester South is an electoral ward of Chichester District, West Sussex, England, and returns two members to sit on Chichester District Council.

== Councillors ==
Year	Member	Party	Member	Party	Member	Party
2019	Sarah Sharp	Green	Heather Barrie	Green		
2015	Pam Dignum	Conservative	Nigel Galloway	Conservative	Len Macey	Conservative
2011	Anne Scicluna	Lib Dem	Pam Dignum	Conservative	Alan Chaplin	Lib Dem
2007	Anne Scicluna	Lib Dem	Pam Dignum	Conservative	Alan Chaplin	Lib Dem

== Election results ==
Chichester District Council Election 2019: Chichester South
Party	Candidate	Votes	%	±%
Green	Sarah Mary Sharp*	987	32.3	
Green	Heather Margaret Barrie*	692	22.6	
Conservative	Jamie David Fitzjohn	324	10.6	
Conservative	Nigel Geoffrey Galloway	321	10.5	
Liberal Democrats	Angus Richard Bond	196	6.4	
Labour	Amanda Jane Atkinson	187	6.1	
Labour	Philip James Wilson	167	5.5	
Liberal Democrats	John Kentish Turbefield	160	5.2	
Turnout		3,056	31.74	
Green gain from Conservative		Swing		
Green gain from Conservative		Swing		

Chichester District Council Election 2007: Chichester South
Party	Candidate	Votes	%	±%
Liberal Democrats	Anne Mary Dorothy Scicluna*	812	17.43	
Conservative	Pam Dignum*	725	15.56	
Liberal Democrats	Alan David Chaplin*	690	14.81	
Liberal Democrats	David John Siggs	687	14.74	
Conservative	Barbara Joan Rees	663	14.24	
Conservative	Estelle Flora Strong	651	13.97	
UKIP	Nigel Degge Wilmot Sitwell	232	4.97	
Labour	Malcolm John Few	199	4.28	
Total votes		4659		
Turnout		1696	33.87	

* Elected
