= Fernhurst (ward) =

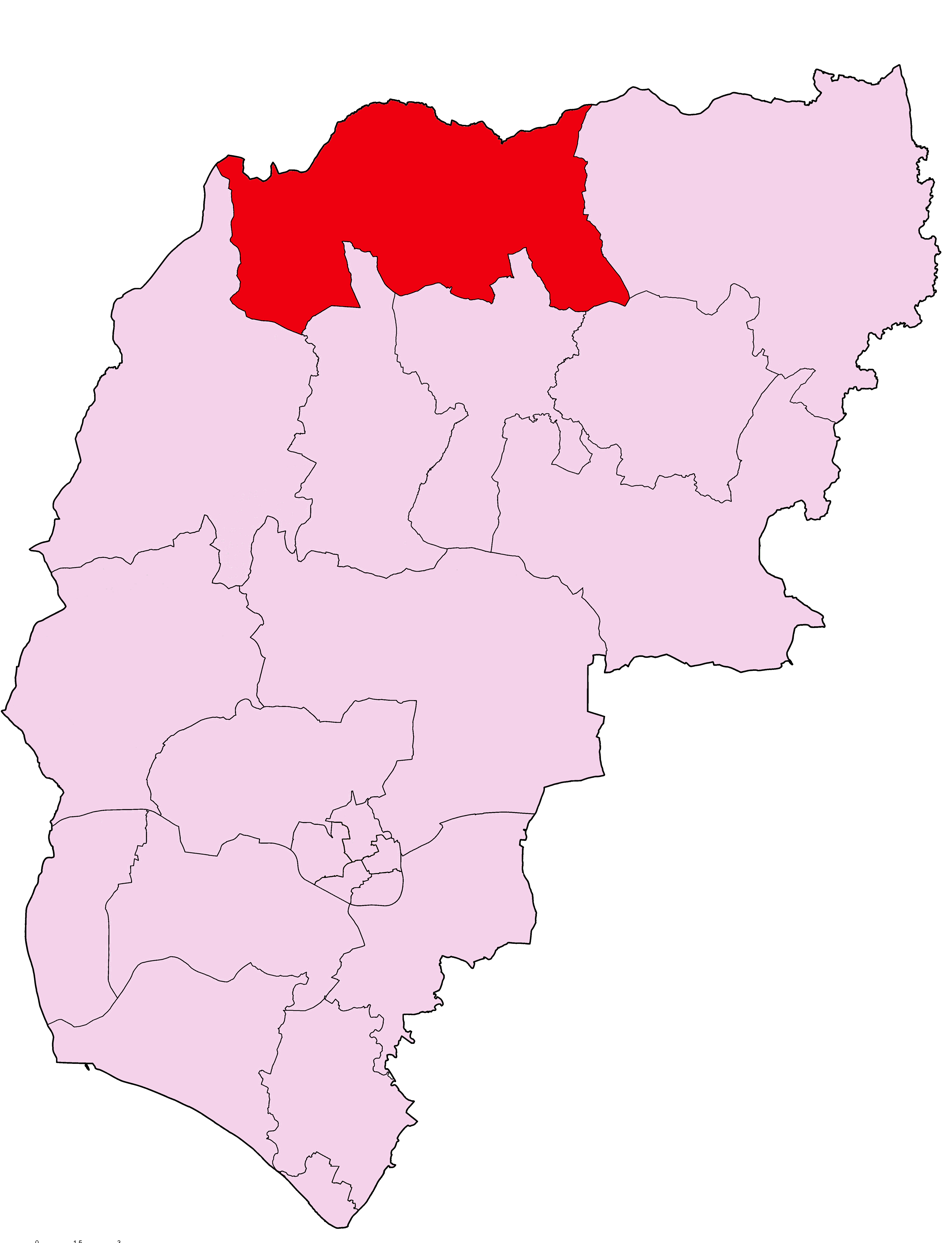
- Shown within Chichester
- Population: 3,903 (2007)
- District: Chichester
- Ceremonial county: West Sussex
- Country: England
- Sovereign state: United Kingdom
- UK Parliament: Chichester
- Councillors: Norma Graves (C); Peter Wilding (C)

Fernhurst is an electoral ward of Chichester District, West Sussex, England and returns two members to sit on Chichester District Council.

Following a district boundary review, the former wards of Plaistow and Rogate were split and merged into Fernhurst in 2019.

== Councillors ==
Year	Member	Party	Member	Party
2019	Norma Graves	Conservative	Peter Wilding	Conservative
2007	Heather Caird	Conservative	Norma Graves	Conservative

== Election results ==
Chichester District Council Election 2019: Fernhurst
Party	Candidate	Votes	%	±%
Conservative	Norma Dorothy Graves*	969	34.3	
Conservative	Peter John Henry Wilding*	922	32.6	
Liberal Democrats	John Derek Morton	690	24.4	
UKIP	Peter Hugh Pearce	227	8.0	
Turnout		2,829	34.35	
Conservative hold		Swing		
Conservative hold		Swing		

Chichester District Council Election 2007: Fernhurst
Party	Candidate	Votes	%	±%
Conservative	Heather Caird*	997	34.29	
Conservative	Norma Graves*	645	22.18	
Independent	Andrew Moncreiff	557	19.15	
Liberal Democrats	Jeremy Spencer Bonnett	362	12.45	
Liberal Democrats	David Dennis Martin-Jenkins	347	11.93	
Total votes		2908		
Turnout		1568	40.30	

* Elected
