= Plaistow (Chichester ward) =

- Shown within Chichester
- Population: 3,729 (2007)
- District: Chichester
- Ceremonial county: West Sussex
- Country: England
- Sovereign state: United Kingdom
- UK Parliament: Chichester

Plaistow was an electoral ward of Chichester District, West Sussex, England that returned two members to sit on Chichester District Council.

Following a district boundary review, it was split between the Fernhurst and Loxwood wards in 2019.

== Election results ==
Plaistow By Election 4th May 2017: Plaistow
Party	Candidate	Votes	%	±%
Conservative	Peter John Henry Wilding	1042		
Liberal Democrats	Ray Ernest John Cooper	373		
Total votes		1421		
Turnout			36.70	
Majority				
Conservative hold		Swing		

Plaistow Election 2015: Plaistow
Party	Candidate	Votes	%	±%
Conservative	Denise Ann Knightley	2066		
Conservative	Nicholas Richard Donald Thomas	1712		
Liberal Democrats	Philip Robert Colmer	696		
Liberal Democrats	Raymond Ernest John Cooper	574		
Total votes		2929		
Turnout			74.91	
Majority				
Conservative hold		Swing		

Plaistow By Election 2012: Plaistow
Party	Candidate	Votes	%	±%
Conservative	Nick Thomas	455	52.72	
Liberal Democrats	Ray Cooper	408	47.28	
Total votes		863	22.59	
Turnout			22.59	
Majority		47		

Chichester District Council Election 2011 (2): Plaistow
Party	Candidate	Votes	%	±%
Conservative	Phillipa Hardwick	1090	33.37	
Conservative	Linda Westmore	1015	31.07	
Liberal Democrats	Ray Cooper	477	14.60	
Liberal Democrats	Tania Bacon	462	14.14	
UKIP	Gail WeinGartner	221	6.76	
Total votes		3266		
Turnout		1879	48.84	
Majority		???		
Conservative hold		Swing		

Plaistow By Election 2010
Party	Candidate	Votes	%	±%
Conservative	Philippa Hardwick	504	57.7	
Liberal Democrats	Raymond Ernest John Cooper	301	34.4	
BNP	Andrew Emerson	69	7.9	
Turnout		874	23.3	
Majority		203		
Conservative hold		Swing		

Plaistow By Election 2009
Party	Candidate	Votes	%	±%
Conservative	John Andrews	455	57.1	
Liberal Democrats	Raymond Ernest John Cooper	342	42.9	
Turnout		797	21.32	
Majority		113		
Conservative hold		Swing		

Chichester District Council Election 2007 (2): Plaistow
Party	Candidate	Votes	%	±%
Conservative	Brian Hooton	1026	39.80	
Conservative	Paul Mackey	977	37.90	
Liberal Democrats	Karen Elizabeth Bonnett	288	11.17	
Liberal Democrats	Raymond Ernest John Cooper	287	11.13	
Total votes		2578		
Turnout		1364	36.77	
Majority		???		
Conservative hold		Swing		

Plaistow Election 18 June 2004
Party	Candidate	Votes	%	±%
Conservative	Brian Hooton	677		
Conservative	Anthony Walker	667		
Liberal Democrats	Raymond Cooper	397		
Liberal Democrats	Paul Colville	383		
Majority				
Turnout		896	24.2	
Conservative hold		Swing		

Plaistow By-Election 14 August 2003
Party	Candidate	Votes	%	±%
Conservative	Paul Mackey	471	52.6	−10.4
Liberal Democrats	Raymond Cooper	363	40.5	+3.5
UKIP	Vivienne Moran	62	6.9	+6.9
Majority		108	12.1	
Turnout		896	24.2	
Conservative hold		Swing		
