= Chichester North (ward) =

Electoral division of West Sussex, England

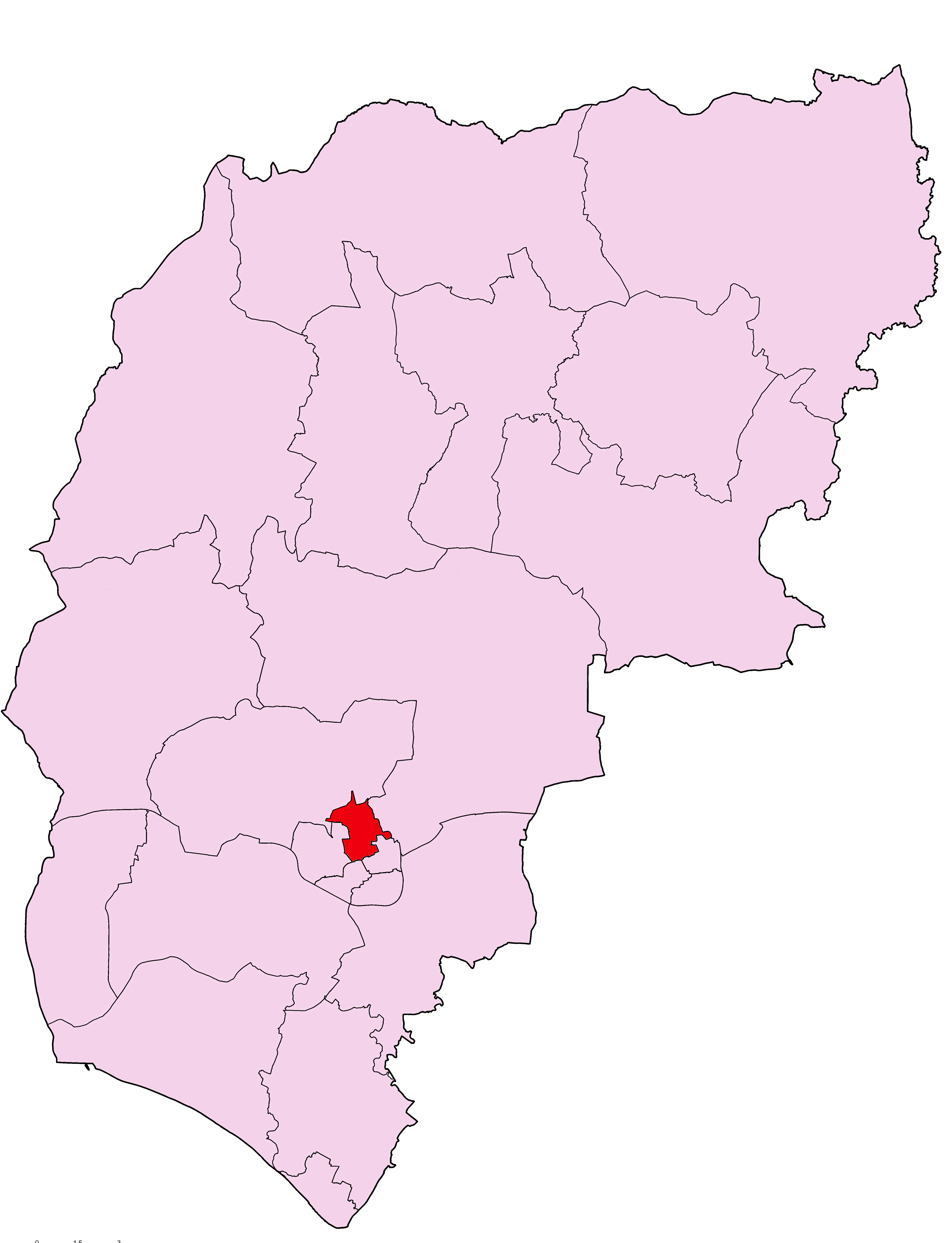
- Shown within Chichester
- Population: 4,612 (2007)
- District: Chichester
- Ceremonial county: West Sussex
- Country: England
- Sovereign state: United Kingdom
- UK Parliament: Chichester
- Councillors: Richard Plowman (LD); Tony Dignum (C)

Chichester North is an electoral ward of Chichester District, West Sussex, England, and returns two members to sit on Chichester District Council.

== Councillors ==
Year	Member	Party	Member	Party
2019	Richard Plowman	Liberal Democrat	Tony Dignum	Conservative

== Election results ==
Chichester District Council Election 2019: Chichester North
Party	Candidate	Votes	%	±%
Liberal Democrats	Richard Edward Plowman*	625	20.0	
Conservative	Anthony Peter Dignum*	623	19.9	
Conservative	Peter John Budge	586	18.8	
Liberal Democrats	Julian Alexander Joy	560	17.9	
Green	Elizabeth Lucy Noble	490	15.7	
Labour	Theo Kent	219	7.0	
Turnout		3,125	38.76	
Liberal Democrats gain from Conservative		Swing		
Conservative hold		Swing		

Chichester District Council Election 2007: Chichester North
Party	Candidate	Votes	%	±%
Conservative	Derek Charles James*	1055	17.15	
Conservative	Stuart Ian King*	1006	16.36	
Conservative	Nicholas Roberts*	969	15.77	
Liberal Democrats	Patricia Hooley	940	15.28	
Liberal Democrats	Richard Edward Plowman	925	15.04	
Liberal Democrats	Edith Pingree	891	14.48	
UKIP	Michael Mason	191	3.10	
Labour	Janet Cynthia Miller	173	2.82	
Total votes		6150		
Turnout		2155	47.14	

* Elected
