= Nigel Sitwell =

English conservationist, writer, editor and businessman

Nigel Degge Wilmot Sitwell (23 August 1935 in Gosport, Hampshire – 2017) was an English conservationist, writer, editor and businessman specialising in wildlife and travel. He is noted for his travels in nearly 100 countries, including Antarctica, Tibet, East Africa and East Asia. In addition he edited and published the WWF magazine series Wildlife for 17 years.

== Career ==
After finishing Sherborne School in 1953 Sitwell went to Canada where he worked as financial journalist for The Montreal Gazette from 1958 to 1961. In 1964, he joined the editorial board of the ailing WWF magazine Animals which was founded in 1963. Subsequently, he bought that magazine. From January 1967 it was published monthly. In May 1974, the title was changed into Wildlife to present a wider range of featured topics.

In 1983, this magazine was renamed into BBC Wildlife. By 2000, Sitwell started the new project Ocean Explorer where he published richly illustrated maps about several areas of the world like Antarctica, Svalbard, South Georgia, Alaska, South America, Falkland Islands, the Caribbean, the Galápagos Islands, the Mediterranean islands, and Greenland. These detailed travel maps are directed in particular to cruise ship passengers and include information about wildlife, landscapes, landmarks, and notable explorers.

In collaboration with Lars-Eric Lindblad he developed the Antarctica program for the cruise line Orient Lines in 1993 where he was expedition leader for 14 seasons on ships such as Professor Khromov, Alla Tarasova, Ocean Princess, and MS Marco Polo. These cruises not only went to Antarctica but also to the Falkland Islands, South Georgia, and the Ross Sea.

Sitwell was often on Galápagos. He first visited this islands in 1967 and travelled there for about fifty times. In 1995, he was among the founder trustees of the Galapagos Conservation Trust where he served as chairman from 1997 to 2006. He was succeeded by Richard Robinson.

Sitwell served as Director of Information for WWF UK. In addition he was member of the Council of the Zoological Society of London and a long-time trustee of Survival International where he was director of the charitable trust from 1996 to 1997. For his achievement in nature conservation he was awarded with the Order of the Golden Ark by HRH Prince Bernhard of the Netherlands.

Sitwell was a member of the UK Independence Party. He was candidate during the West Sussex County Council elections in the district Chichester South in 2005, 2009, and 2013.

He died at age 81 in 2017 from Alzheimer's disease.

== Selected works ==
- Happy The Man. Episodes in an Exciting Life, 1967 (with Sir Peter Scott)
- Animal Life '73: the World Conservation Yearbook, 1973
- An Artist in Africa, 1973 (with David Shepherd)
- Wild Life Today: World Conservation Handbook, 1974
- Wildlife '74, the World Conservation Yearbook, 1974
- Wildlife '75, the World Conservation Yearbook, 1975
- Wild Life Now, 1976
- Wildlife '76, the World Conservation Yearbook, 1976
- The World of Wild Life, 1977
- Wildlife '77, the World Conservation Yearbook, 1977
- Wildlife '78, the World Conservation Yearbook, 1978
- Wildlife '79, 1979
- Wildlife '80, the World Conservation Yearbook, 1980
- A Field Guide to the British Countryside, 1981
- Wildlife '81, the World Conservation Yearbook, 1981
- Wildlife & nature photography, 1981
- Wildlife '82/ '83, 1983
- Wildlife '84, the World Conservation Yearbook, 1984
- Shell Guide to Britain's Threatened Wild Life, 1984
- Safari: The East African Diaries of a Wildlife Photographer, 1984
- Antarctic Primer, 1997
- Antarctica: the Reader, 2006
- Galapagos: A Guide to the Animals and Plants, 2011
