= Local Alliance =

- Leader: Cllr Timothy Johnson
- Deputy: Cllr Donna Johnson
- Founded: 5 February 2019; 7 years ago
- Headquarters: 15 Lifeboat Way, Selsey, West Sussex, PO20 0TX
- Ideology: Localism
- Colours: Black; White
- West Sussex County Council: 1 / 70
- Chichester District Council: 4 / 36
- Selsey Town Council: 17 / 18

Website
- www.localalliance.uk

The Local Alliance is a political party based in Chichester, England. The party was founded in 2019 and has successfully contested local elections to Chichester District Council and West Sussex County Council.

== Election results ==
=== West Sussex County Council ===
Election	Leader	Votes	%	Seats	±	Status
2021	Timothy Johnson	1,733	0.71	1 / 70	▲1	Opposition

=== Chichester District Council ===
Election	Leader	Votes	%	Seats	±	Status
2019	Timothy Johnson	1,528	2.62	2 / 36	▲2	Opposition
2023	Timothy Johnson	2,603		4 / 36	▲2	Opposition
