= 1979 Chichester District Council election =

1979 UK local government election

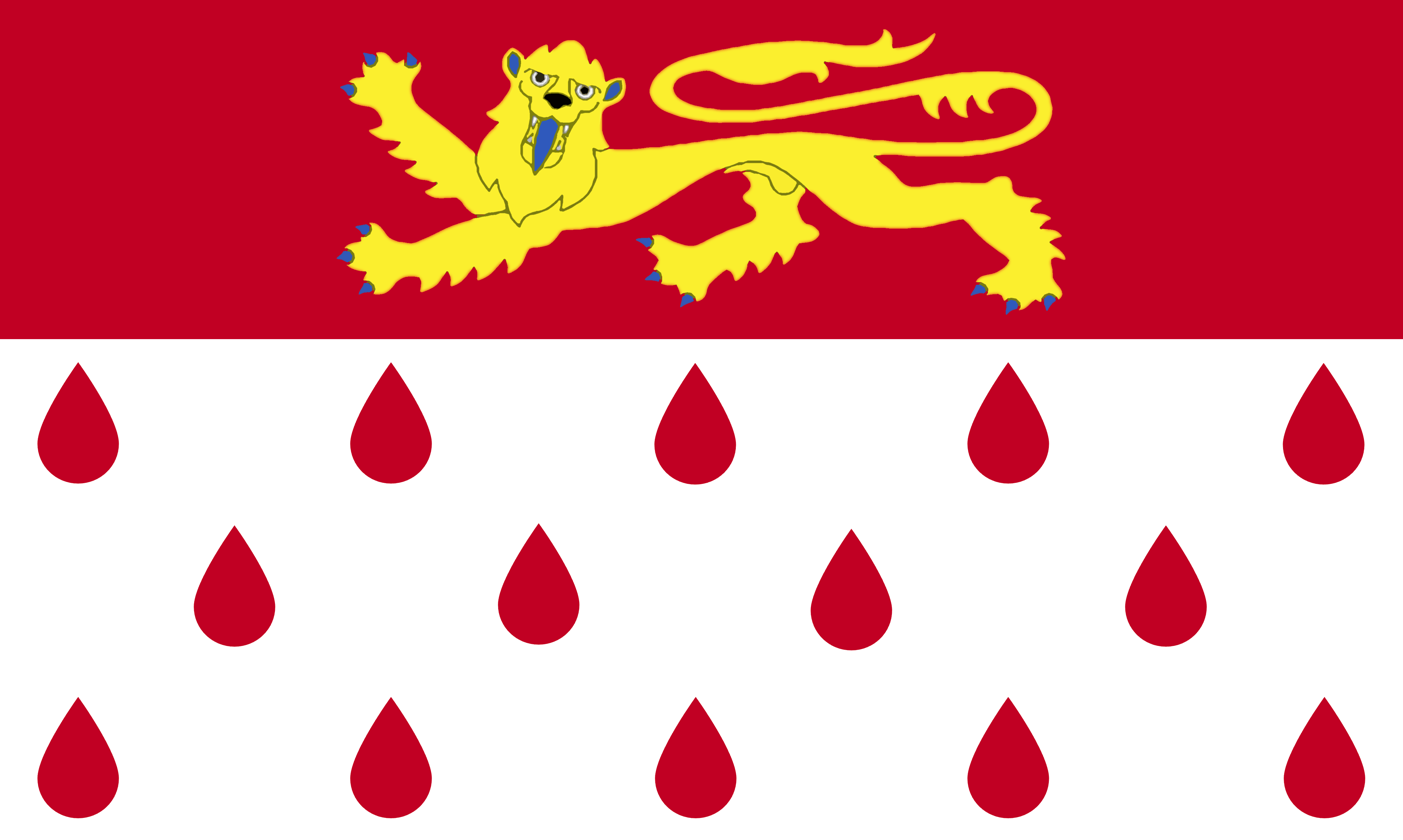
← 1976	3 May 1979	1983 →

All 50 seats to Chichester District Council 26 seats needed for a majority
	First party	Second party
Party	Conservative	Liberal
Last election	36 (Note: Based on pre-1979 boundaries.)	11
Seats won	27	1
Seat change	▼6 (Note: Indicates boundary change—so this is a nominal figure.)	▲10
Popular vote	25,365	17,894
Percentage	40.0%	28.1%
Council control before election
Conservative
Council control after election
Conservative

Elections to Chichester District Council in West Sussex, United Kingdom were held on 3 May 1979, the same day as the general election.

The whole council was up for election and resulted in a Conservative majority.

== Boundary changes ==
Boundary changes resulted in the creation of three new wards: Chichester North, Selsey North and Selsey South. The number of councillors representing Chichester West and Southbourne were reduced, from 5 to 3 and 4 to 3 respectively. The Selsey ward was abolished.

Boundary changes in effect from May 1979
Old wards	New wards
Chichester East	Chichester North‡
Chichester West	Chichester North‡
Selsey*	Selsey North‡
Selsey*	Selsey South‡
* Abolished	‡ New creation

== Election result ==
Chichester District Council Election Result 1979
Party	Seats	Gains	Losses	Net gain/loss	Seats %	Votes %	Votes	+/−
Conservative	27	2	8	▼6	54.0	40.0	25,365	–9.5
Liberal	11	10	0	▲10	22.0	28.1	17,894	+6.9
Independent	7	1	2	▼1	14.0	11.5	7,325	+1.4
Residents	3	0	1	▼1	6.0	9.6	6,106	–4.1
Ind. Conservative	2	2	0	▲2	4.0	3.6	2,278	N/A
Labour	0	0	0	Steady	0.0	4.7	2,996	+2.6
Ind. Ratepayers	0	0	0	Steady	0.0	1.4	905	–2.0
SPA (UK)	0	0	0	Steady	0.0	1.3	833	N/A

↓
27	11	7	3	2
Conservative	Liberal	Independent	Res.	I.C.

== Ward results ==
Birdham (1 seat)
Party	Candidate	Votes	%	±
Conservative	J. Darley	Unopposed		
Turnout		0	0.0	N/A
Registered electors		1,432		
Conservative hold				

Bosham (2 seats)
Party	Candidate	Votes	%	±%
Conservative	H. Rycroft	1,332	36.8	N/A
Independent	D. Yden	1,254	34.6	N/A
Independent	J. Lillywhite	1,037	28.6	N/A
Turnout		3,623	75.3	N/A
Registered electors		3,099		
Conservative hold		Swing		
Independent hold		Swing		

Boxgrove (1 seat)
Party	Candidate	Votes	%	±
Conservative	E. Kirkby-Bott	Unopposed		
Turnout		0	0.0	N/A
Registered electors		1,334		
Conservative hold				

Bury (1 seat)
Party	Candidate	Votes	%	±
Conservative	C. Roberts	Unopposed		
Turnout		0	0.0	N/A
Registered electors		1,238		
Conservative hold				

Chichester East (3 seats)
Party	Candidate	Votes	%	±%
Liberal	A. French	1,194	40.9	+12.3
Conservative	P. Combes	1,184	35.4	–12.9
Liberal	C. Tupper	1,183		
Liberal	E. French	1,066		
Conservative	M. Gowing	910		
Conservative	D. Myers	894		
Labour	D. Morrison	725	23.7	+10.7
Labour	T. Rooth	642		
Labour	P. Norris	629		
Turnout		8,428	71.9	+28.5
Registered electors		4,379		
Liberal gain from Conservative		Swing		
Conservative hold		Swing		
Liberal gain from Conservative		Swing		

Chichester North (3 seats)
Party	Candidate	Votes	%	±%
Liberal	J. Rankin	1,307	51.0	N/A
Conservative	T. France	1,289	49.0	N/A
Liberal	L. Eyles	1,266		
Liberal	A. Bird	1,263		
Conservative	E. Craig	1,219		
Conservative	D. Hoult	1,183		
Turnout		7,527	74.1	N/A
Registered electors		3,778		
Liberal win (new seat)				
Conservative win (new seat)				
Liberal win (new seat)				

Chichester South (3 seats)
Party	Candidate	Votes	%	±%
Liberal	P. Weston	1,743	63.6	+13.9
Liberal	K. Smith	1,549		
Liberal	A. Scicluna	1,546		
Conservative	A. Black	1,003	36.4	–13.9
Conservative	J. Rankin	925		
Conservative	F. Robertson	839		
Turnout		7,605	71.8	
Registered electors		4,054		
Liberal gain from Conservative		Swing		
Liberal gain from Conservative		Swing		
Liberal hold		Swing		

Chichester West (3 seats)
Party	Candidate	Votes	%	±%
Liberal	L. Holden	1,627	53.2	+21.8
Liberal	M. Clough	1,564		
Liberal	S. Lawrence	1,470		
Conservative	W. Doody	1,455	46.8	–14.5
Conservative	U. Hogg	1,413		
Conservative	A. Slade	1,240		
Turnout		8,769	72.5	+28.4
Registered electors		4,723		
Liberal gain from Conservative		Swing		
Liberal gain from Conservative		Swing		
Liberal gain from Conservative		Swing		

Donnington (1 seat)
Party	Candidate	Votes	%	±
Conservative	J. Laird	Unopposed		
Turnout		0	0.0	N/A
Registered electors		1,428		
Conservative hold				

Easebourne (1 seat)
Party	Candidate	Votes	%	±%
Conservative	J. Wood	647	61.4	–8.0
Labour	A. Groves	406	38.6	+8.0
Turnout		1,053	71.8	+29.6
Registered electors		1,477		
Conservative hold		Swing		

East Wittering (1 seat)
Party	Candidate	Votes	%	±
Conservative	C. Craven	Unopposed		
Turnout		0	0.0	N/A
Registered electors		2,370		
Conservative hold				

Fernhurst (2 seats)
Party	Candidate	Votes	%	±%
Independent	M. Gilbert	1,047	40.3	+16.5
Conservative	S. Hamilton	792	30.5	+4.5
Independent	C. Barkman	757	29.2	N/A
Turnout		2,596	72.1	+21.1
Registered electors		2,319		
Independent hold		Swing		
Conservative hold		Swing		

Funtington (1 seat)
Party	Candidate	Votes	%	±
Independent	D. Gauntlett	Unopposed		
Turnout		0	0.0	N/A
Registered electors		1,821		
Independent hold				

Graffham (1 seat)
Party	Candidate	Votes	%	±
Independent	K. Murray	Unopposed		
Turnout		0	0.0	N/A
Registered electors		1,466		
Independent hold				

Harting (1 seat)
Party	Candidate	Votes	%	±
Conservative	H. Booker	Unopposed		
Turnout		0	0.0	N/A
Registered electors		1,387		
Conservative hold				

Hunston (1 seat)
Party	Candidate	Votes	%	±%
Conservative	M. Nicholson	764	59.6	N/A
Liberal	W. Sherlock	518	40.4	N/A
Turnout		1,282	74.3	N/A
Registered electors		1,738		
Conservative hold		Swing		

Lavant (1 seat)
Party	Candidate	Votes	%	±%
Liberal	F. Heald	598	54.5	+16.9
Conservative	F. Longmore	499	45.5	–5.5
Turnout		1,097	73.0	+24.0
Registered electors		1,484		
Liberal gain from Conservative		Swing		

Linchmere (1 seat)
Party	Candidate	Votes	%	±
Conservative	R. Gibson	Unopposed		
Turnout		0	0.0	N/A
Registered electors		1,194		
Conservative gain from Independent				

Lodsworth (1 seat)
Party	Candidate	Votes	%	±
Conservative	R. Hancock	Unopposed		
Turnout		0	0.0	N/A
Registered electors		1,415		
Conservative hold				

Midhurst (2 seats)
Party	Candidate	Votes	%	±%
Independent	P. Burne	1,525	34.7	N/A
Ind. Conservative	D. Mott	1,260	28.6	N/A
Conservative	P. Stonehouse	586	26.3	N/A
Conservative	M. Smith	572		N/A
Labour	P. Pritchard	455	10.3	N/A
Turnout		4,398	74.8	N/A
Registered electors		3,395		
Independent hold		Swing		
Ind. Conservative gain from Independent		Swing		

Oving (1 seat)
Party	Candidate	Votes	%	±%
Conservative	N. Best	638	62.9	+4.8
Independent	J. Stapleford	377	37.1	N/A
Turnout		1,015	71.3	+36.6
Registered electors		1,401		
Conservative hold		Swing		

Petworth (2 seats)
Party	Candidate	Votes	%	±
Conservative	C. Linton	Unopposed		
Conservative	J. Duncton	Unopposed		
Turnout		0	0.0	N/A
Registered electors		2,851		
Conservative hold				
Conservative hold				

Plaistow (2 seats)
Party	Candidate	Votes	%	±
Conservative	P. Luttman-Johnson	Unopposed		
Conservative	T. Micklem	Unopposed		
Turnout		0	0.0	N/A
Registered electors		3,024		
Conservative hold				
Conservative hold				

Rogate (1 seat)
Party	Candidate	Votes	%	±%
Conservative	R. Alexander	816	75.7	N/A
Independent	A. Jackson	262	24.3	N/A
Turnout		1,078	75.1	N/A
Registered electors		1,427		
Conservative hold		Swing		

Selsey North (2 seats)
Party	Candidate	Votes	%	±
Conservative	B. Ager	Unopposed		
Conservative	T. Robinson	Unopposed		
Turnout		0	0.0	N/A
Registered electors		3,231		
Conservative win (new seat)				
Conservative win (new seat)				

Selsey South (2 seats)
Party	Candidate	Votes	%	±%
Ind. Conservative	P. Hammond	1,018	27.9	N/A
Conservative	J. Whiteman	925	49.2	N/A
Conservative	R. Seaman	868		N/A
SPA	H. Van Raat	833	22.9	N/A
Turnout		3,644	74.9	N/A
Registered electors		2,957		
Ind. Conservative win (new seat)				
Conservative win (new seat)				

Sidlesham (1 seat)
Party	Candidate	Votes	%	±%
Independent	A. Petrie-Hay	572	80.5	N/A
Labour	R. Norris	139	19.5	N/A
Turnout		711	74.1	+21.1
Registered electors		959		
Independent gain from Residents		Swing		

Southbourne (3 seats)
Party	Candidate	Votes	%	±%
Residents	L. Denby	2,322	62.4	–8.3
Residents	I. Sutherland	1,952		
Residents	C. Singer	1,832		
Conservative	P. Warren	986	28.4	+17.3
Conservative	P. Blake	950		
Conservative	M. Higgins	842		
Ind. Ratepayers	G. Feltham	489	9.2	–9.0
Ind. Ratepayers	D. Feltham	416		
Turnout		9,789	74.3	+27.4
Registered electors		4,742		
Residents hold		Swing		
Residents hold		Swing		
Residents hold		Swing		

Stedham (1 seat)
Party	Candidate	Votes	%	±
Conservative	A. Burdett	Unopposed		
Turnout		0	0.0	N/A
Registered electors		1,556		
Conservative hold				

Stoughton (1 seat)
Party	Candidate	Votes	%	±
Independent	J. Mann	Unopposed		
Turnout		0	0.0	N/A
Registered electors		1,321		
Independent hold				

West Wittering (1 seat)
Party	Candidate	Votes	%	±
Conservative	H. Allen	Unopposed		
Turnout		0	0.0	N/A
Registered electors		2,271		
Conservative hold				

Westbourne (1 seat)
Party	Candidate	Votes	%	±%
Conservative	S. Bray	594	54.6	–1.4
Independent	D. Rudkin	494	45.4	N/A
Turnout		1,088	73.7	+25.0
Registered electors		1,476		
Conservative hold		Swing		

Wisborough Green (1 seat)
Party	Candidate	Votes	%	±
Conservative	J. Illius	Unopposed		
Turnout		0	0.0	N/A
Registered electors		1,858		
Conservative hold				
