= 1976 Chichester District Council election =

1976 UK local government election

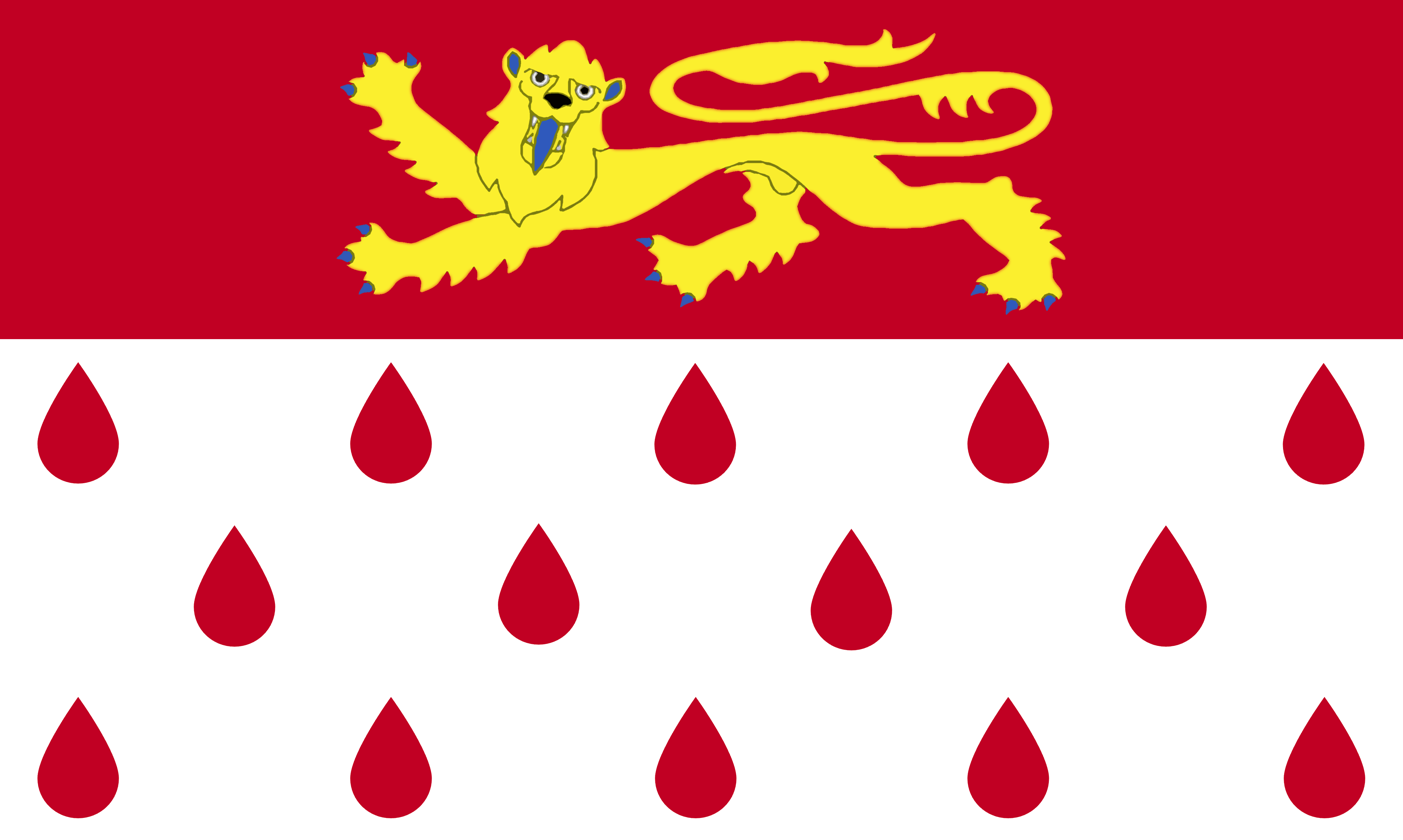
← 1973	6 May 1976	1979 →

All 50 seats to Chichester District Council 26 seats needed for a majority
	First party	Second party
Party	Conservative	Independent
Last election	18	22
Seats won	36	8
Seat change	▲18	▼14
Popular vote	21,432	4,390
Percentage	49.5%	10.1%
Council control before election
No overall control
Council control after election
Conservative

Elections to Chichester District Council in West Sussex, United Kingdom were held on 6 May 1976.

The whole council was up for election and resulted in a Conservative majority.

== Election result ==
Chichester District Council Election Result 1976
Party	Seats	Gains	Losses	Net gain/loss	Seats %	Votes %	Votes	+/−
Conservative	36	18	0	▲18	72.0	49.5	21,432	+29.5%
Independent	8	0	14	▼14	16.0	10.1	4,390	–22.2%
Residents	5	2	0	▲2	10.0	13.7	5,91	+5.6%
Liberal	1	0	5	▼5	2.0	21.2	9,161	–0.3%
Ind. Ratepayers	0	0	0	Steady	0.0	3.4	1,465	N/A
Labour	0	0	1	▼1	0.0	2.1	932	–16.0%

↓
36	8	5	1
Conservative	Independent	Residents	Lib.

== Ward results ==
Birdham (1 seat)
Party	Candidate	Votes	%	±
Conservative	J. Darley	Unopposed		
Turnout		0	0.0	N/A
Registered electors		1,373		
Conservative hold				

Bosham (2 seats)
Party	Candidate	Votes	%	±
Conservative	R. Ryecroft	Unopposed		
Independent	J. Lillywhite	Unopposed		
Turnout		0	0.0	N/A
Registered electors		3,097		
Conservative gain from Independent				
Independent hold				

Boxgrove (1 seat)
Party	Candidate	Votes	%	±%
Conservative	E. Kirkby-Bott	382	52.6	N/A
Liberal	C. Kempson	344	47.4	N/A
Turnout		726	55.5	N/A
Registered electors		1,308		
Conservative hold		Swing		

Bury (1 seat)
Party	Candidate	Votes	%	±
Conservative	C. Roberts	Unopposed		
Turnout		0	0.0	N/A
Registered electors		1,188		
Conservative hold				

Chichester East (3 seats)
Party	Candidate	Votes	%	±%
Conservative	P. Combes	912	48.3	+17.9
Conservative	J. Finlay	813		
Conservative	T. France	727		
Liberal	D. Shepherd	524	28.6	–3.6
Independent	C. Spawton	512	10.1	+10.1
Liberal	C. Tupper	470		
Liberal	A. French	461		
Labour	T. Rooth	333	13.0	–24.8
Labour	R. Norris	327		
Turnout		5,079	43.4	–2.6
Registered electors		5,256		
Conservative gain from Liberal		Swing		
Conservative hold		Swing		
Conservative gain from Liberal		Swing		

Chichester South (3 seats)
Party	Candidate	Votes	%	±%
Conservative	B. Sampson	773	50.3	+35.9
Conservative	P. Porteous	758		
Liberal	P. Weston	743	49.7	+1.5
Liberal	K. Smith	735		
Liberal	J. Seddon	712		
Conservative	J. Steward	689		
Turnout		4,410	35.1	–10.8
Registered electors		4,314		
Conservative gain from Liberal		Swing		
Conservative gain from Liberal		Swing		
Liberal hold		Swing		

Chichester West (5 seats)
Party	Candidate	Votes	%	±%
Conservative	E. Craig	1,692	61.3	+43.3
Conservative	W. Doody	1,687		
Conservative	D. Hoult	1,675		
Conservative	A. Slade	1,664		
Conservative	J. Taylor	1,540		
Liberal	L. Holden	1,139	31.4	+11.4
Independent	G. Tullet	1,024	7.6	–3.0
Liberal	M. Dixon	861		
Liberal	V. Hubbard	779		
Liberal	D. Johnston	758		
Liberal	I. Miller	730		
Turnout		13,529	44.1	–15.6
Registered electors		8,741		
Conservative gain from Independent		Swing		
Conservative gain from Independent		Swing		
Conservative hold		Swing		
Conservative gain from Independent		Swing		
Conservative hold		Swing		

Donnington (1 seat)
Party	Candidate	Votes	%	±
Conservative	J. Laird	Unopposed		
Turnout		0	0.0	N/A
Registered electors		1,460		
Conservative hold				

Easebourne (1 seat)
Party	Candidate	Votes	%	±%
Conservative	E. Knight	433	69.4	+12.3
Labour	A. Groves	191	30.6	−12.3
Turnout		624	42.2	–2.8
Registered electors		1,479		
Conservative hold		Swing		

East Wittering (1 seat)
Party	Candidate	Votes	%	±
Conservative	C. Craven	Unopposed		
Turnout		0	0.0	N/A
Registered electors		2,045		
Conservative hold				

Fernhurst (2 seats)
Party	Candidate	Votes	%	±%
Independent	R. Cole	687	33.7	+6.7
Conservative	S. Hamilton	529	26.0	N/A
Independent	M. Gilbert	485	23.8	N/A
Liberal	S. Schlich	335	16.5	–3.2
Turnout		2,036	51.0	+2.8
Registered electors		3,041		
Independent hold		Swing		
Conservative gain from Independent		Swing		

Funtington (1 seat)
Party	Candidate	Votes	%	±
Independent	D. Gauntlett	Unopposed		
Turnout		0	0.0	N/A
Registered electors		1,839		
Independent hold				

Graffham (1 seat)
Party	Candidate	Votes	%	±
Independent	K. Murray	Unopposed		
Turnout		0	0.0	N/A
Registered electors		1,470		
Independent hold				

Harting (1 seat)
Party	Candidate	Votes	%	±
Conservative	P. Booker	Unopposed		
Turnout		0	0.0	N/A
Registered electors		1,390		
Conservative gain from Independent				

Hunston (1 seat)
Party	Candidate	Votes	%	±
Conservative	M. Nicholson	Unopposed		
Turnout		0	0.0	N/A
Registered electors		1,761		
Conservative gain from Independent				

Lavant (1 seat)
Party	Candidate	Votes	%	±%
Conservative	N. Butcher	365	51.0	N/A
Liberal	F. Heald	269	37.6	–12.3
Labour	D. Morrison	81	11.3	N/A
Turnout		715	49.0	+13.0
Registered electors		1,459		
Conservative gain from Independent		Swing		

Linchmere (1 seat)
Party	Candidate	Votes	%	±
Independent	R. De Hailes	Unopposed		
Turnout		0	0.0	N/A
Registered electors		1,144		
Independent hold				

Lodsworth (1 seat)
Party	Candidate	Votes	%	±
Conservative	R. Hancock	Unopposed		
Turnout		0	0.0	N/A
Registered electors		1,387		
Conservative gain from Independent				

Midhurst (2 seats)
Party	Candidate	Votes	%	±
Independent	P. Burne	Unopposed		
Independent	D. Mott	Unopposed		
Turnout		0	0.0	N/A
Registered electors		3,143		
Independent hold				
Independent hold				

Oving (1 seat)
Party	Candidate	Votes	%	±%
Conservative	N. Best	257	58.1	N/A
Independent	G. Taylor	185	41.9	N/A
Turnout		442	34.7	N/A
Registered electors		1,274		
Conservative hold		Swing		

Petworth (2 seats)
Party	Candidate	Votes	%	±
Conservative	C. Linton	Unopposed		
Conservative	J. Duncton	Unopposed		
Turnout		0	0.0	N/A
Registered electors		2,766		
Conservative hold				
Conservative hold				

Plaistow (2 seats)
Party	Candidate	Votes	%	±
Conservative	P. Luttman-Johnson	Unopposed		
Conservative	T. Micklem	Unopposed		
Turnout		0	0.0	N/A
Registered electors		2,857		
Conservative gain from Independent				
Conservative hold				

Rogate (1 seat)
Party	Candidate	Votes	%	±
Conservative	R. Alexander	Unopposed		
Turnout		0	0.0	N/A
Registered electors		1,439		
Conservative gain from Independent				

Selsey (4 seats)
Party	Candidate	Votes	%	±%
Conservative	W. Carey	1,305	82.0	N/A
Conservative	R. Seamen	1,195		N/A
Conservative	B. Ager	1,155		N/A
Conservative	H. Meston	1,091		N/A
Independent	W. Spragg	1,043	18.0	N/A
Turnout		5,789	32.5	N/A
Registered electors		7,225		
Conservative hold		Swing		
Conservative hold		Swing		
Conservative hold		Swing		
Conservative hold		Swing		

Sidlesham (1 seat)
Party	Candidate	Votes	%	±%
Residents	A. Petrie-Hay	227	40.0	N/A
Conservative	C. Ash	208	36.5	N/A
Independent	D. Mitchell	134	23.5	N/A
Turnout		569	53.0	N/A
Registered electors		1,074		
Residents gain from Labour		Swing		

Southbourne (4 seats)
Party	Candidate	Votes	%	±%
Residents	R. Roberts	1,581	70.7	
Residents	C. Singer	1,393		
Residents	L. Denby	1,363		
Residents	I. Sutherland	1,349		
Conservative	G. Mason	893	11.1	N/A
Ind. Ratepayers	G. Feltham	536	18.2	N/A
Ind. Ratepayers	D. Feltham	476		N/A
Ind. Ratepayers	R. Marshall	453		N/A
Turnout		8,044	46.9	+3.2
Registered electors		6,418		
Residents hold		Swing		
Residents hold		Swing		
Residents hold		Swing		
Residents gain from Independent		Swing		

Stedham (1 seat)
Party	Candidate	Votes	%	±
Conservative	A. Burdett	Unopposed		
Turnout		0	0.0	N/A
Registered electors		1,510		
Conservative gain from Independent				

Stoughton (1 seat)
Party	Candidate	Votes	%	±%
Independent	J. Mann	320	51.1	+0.6
Conservative	H. Gauntlett	306	48.9	–0.6
Turnout		626	48.0	+11.9
Registered electors		1,304		
Independent hold		Swing		

West Wittering (1 seat)
Party	Candidate	Votes	%	±
Conservative	H. Allen	Unopposed		
Turnout		0	0.0	N/A
Registered electors		2,120		
Conservative gain from Independent				

Westbourne (1 seat)
Party	Candidate	Votes	%	±%
Conservative	S. Bray	383	56.0	N/A
Liberal	D. Rudkin	301	44.0	–10.3
Turnout		684	48.7	+14.0
Registered electors		1,405		
Conservative gain from Liberal		Swing		

Wisborough Green (1 seat)
Party	Candidate	Votes	%	±
Conservative	J. Illius	Unopposed		
Turnout		0	0.0	N/A
Registered electors		1,838		
Conservative hold				
