= 1983 Chichester District Council election =

1983 UK local government election

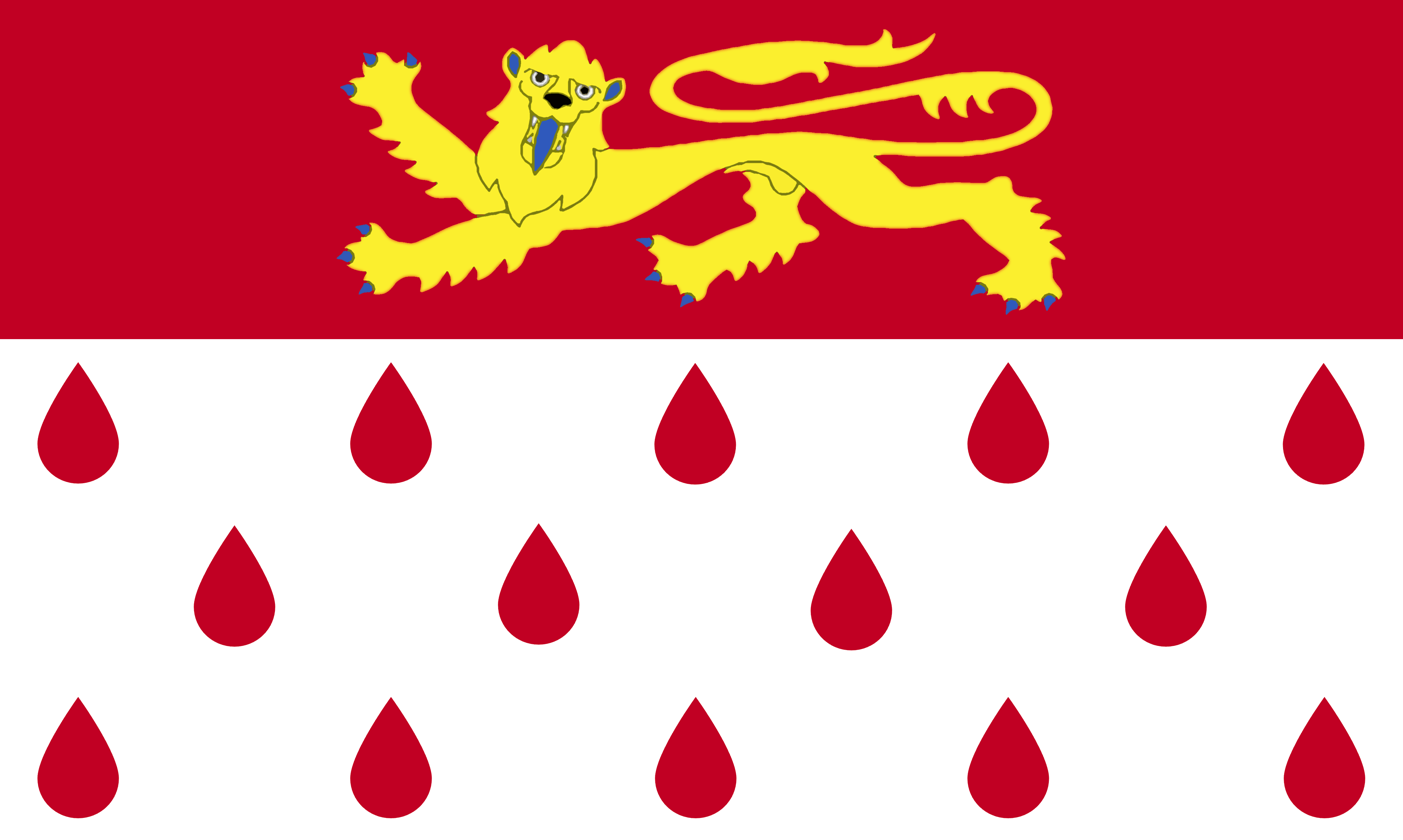
← 1979	5 May 1983	1987 →

All 50 seats to Chichester District Council 26 seats needed for a majority
	First party	Second party
Party	Conservative	Alliance
Last election	27	11
Seats won	27	12
Seat change	Steady	▲1
Popular vote	18,522	14,112
Percentage	40.6%	30.9%
Council control before election
Conservative
Council control after election
Conservative

Elections to Chichester District Council in West Sussex, United Kingdom were held on 5 May 1983.

The whole council was up for election and resulted in a Conservative majority.

== Election result ==
Chichester District Council Election Result 1983
Party	Seats	Gains	Losses	Net gain/loss	Seats %	Votes %	Votes	+/−
Conservative	27	3	3	Steady	54.0	40.6	18,522	+0.6
Alliance	12	2	1	▲1	24.0	30.9	14,112	+2.8
Independent	8	1	0	▲1	16.0	15.4	7,011	+3.9
Residents	2	0	1	▼1	4.0	5.7	2,597	–3.9
Independent Liberal	1	1	0	▲1	2.0	0.0	0	N/A
Labour	0	0	0	Steady	0.0	3.7	1,674	–1.0
Ind. Conservative	0	0	2	▼2	0.00	2.8	1,274	–0.8

↓
27	12	8	2	1
Conservative	Alliance	Independent	Res.	I.L.

== Ward results ==
Birdham (1 seat)
Party	Candidate	Votes	%	±%
Conservative	J. Darley	638	82.6	N/A
Alliance	M. D'Arcy	134	17.4	N/A
Turnout		772	52.7	N/A
Registered electors		1,456		
Conservative hold		Swing		

Bosham (2 seats)
Party	Candidate	Votes	%	±%
Conservative	J. Stocker	828	34.1	–2.7
Independent	D. Yden	666	27.4	–7.2
Independent	J. Lillywhite	570	23.4	–5.2
Alliance	Q. Cox	367	15.1	N/A
Turnout		2,431	56.0	–19.3
Registered electors		3,148		
Conservative hold		Swing		
Independent hold		Swing		

Boxgrove (1 seat)
Party	Candidate	Votes	%	±%
Conservative	E. Kirkby-Bott	414	30.9	N/A
Alliance	N. Brooks	250	18.7	N/A
Independent	D. Deans	140	17.4	N/A
Turnout		804	60.0	N/A
Registered electors		1,339		
Conservative hold		Swing		

Bury (1 seat)
Party	Candidate	Votes	%	±%
Conservative	I. Hyde	433	71.0	N/A
Labour	C. Townroe	177	29.0	N/A
Turnout		610	52.0	N/A
Registered electors		1,173		
Conservative hold		Swing		

Chichester East (3 seats)
Party	Candidate	Votes	%	±%
Alliance	M. French	870	49.3	–8.4
Alliance	A. French	819		
Alliance	C. Tupper	814		
Conservative	P. Combes	790	40.6	+5.2
Conservative	I. Mays	657		
Conservative	A. Missen	614		
Labour	D. Morrison	269	10.1	–13.6
Labour	P. Norris	247		
Turnout		5,080	39.9	–32.0
Registered electors		4,954		
Alliance hold		Swing		
Alliance gain from Conservative		Swing		
Alliance hold		Swing		

Chichester North (3 seats)
Party	Candidate	Votes	%	±%
Conservative	H. Carlton	963	49.5	+0.5
Conservative	A. Hue	913		
Alliance	J. Rankin	860	31.8	–19.2
Alliance	L. Eyles	831		
Conservative	A. Smith	754		
Ind. Conservative	E. Craig	644	12.1	N/A
Independent	M. Bell	352	6.6	N/A
Turnout		5,317	45.9	–28.2
Registered electors		4,543		
Conservative gain from Alliance		Swing		
Conservative hold		Swing		
Alliance hold		Swing		

Chichester South (3 seats)
Party	Candidate	Votes	%	±%
Alliance	P. Weston	937	67.8	–4.2
Alliance	A. Scicluna	893		
Alliance	K. Smith	870		
Conservative	D. Clark	850	21.4	–15.0
Labour	J. Kennett	167	10.8	N/A
Labour	G. Jacobs	139		
Labour	J. Moran	123		
Turnout		3,979	44.9	–26.9
Registered electors		4,046		
Alliance hold		Swing		
Alliance hold		Swing		
Alliance hold		Swing		

Chichester West (3 seats)
Party	Candidate	Votes	%	±%
Alliance	T. Siggs	1,020	53.8	+0.6
Alliance	L. Holden	998		
Alliance	M. Clough	949		
Conservative	C. Spawton	898	30.8	–16.0
Conservative	G. Thomas	802		
Ind. Conservative	F. Craig	498	9.0	N/A
Independent	H. Bell	347	6.3	N/A
Turnout		5,512	49.3	–23.2
Registered electors		4,753		
Alliance hold		Swing		
Alliance hold		Swing		
Alliance hold		Swing		

Donnington (1 seat)
Party	Candidate	Votes	%	±%
Conservative	B. Manicom	390	53.4	N/A
Alliance	T. Wheeler	341	46.6	N/A
Turnout		731	50.5	N/A
Registered electors		1,460		
Conservative hold		Swing		

Easebourne (1 seat)
Party	Candidate	Votes	%	±%
Conservative	J. Wood	383	65.1	+1.0
Independent	E. Knight	205	34.9	N/A
Turnout		588	37.0	–34.8
Registered electors		1,584		
Conservative hold		Swing		

East Wittering (1 seat)
Party	Candidate	Votes	%	±%
Conservative	C. Craven	644	64.6	N/A
Alliance	J. Matthews	353	35.4	N/A
Turnout		997	38.9	N/A
Registered electors		2,589		
Conservative hold		Swing		

Fernhurst (2 seats)
Party	Candidate	Votes	%	±%
Conservative	S. Hamilton	835	43.6	+13.1
Independent	M. Gilbert	614	32.1	–8.2
Independent	M. Jenkins	466	24.3	N/A
Turnout		1,915	59.6	–12.5
Registered electors		2,431		
Conservative hold		Swing		
Independent hold		Swing		

Funtington (1 seat)
Party	Candidate	Votes	%	±
Independent	D. Gauntlett	Unopposed		
Turnout		0	0.0	N/A
Registered electors		1,902		
Independent hold				

Graffham (1 seat)
Party	Candidate	Votes	%	±
Independent	K. Murray	Unopposed		
Turnout		0	0.0	N/A
Registered electors		1,502		
Independent hold				

Harting (1 seat)
Party	Candidate	Votes	%	±
Independent Liberal	M. Stuart Parker	Unopposed		
Turnout		0	0.0	N/A
Registered electors		1,374		
Independent Liberal gain from Conservative				

Hunston (1 seat)
Party	Candidate	Votes	%	±%
Conservative	P. Cheesman	541	67.7	+8.1
Alliance	F. Wilton	258	32.3	–8.1
Turnout		799	43.0	–31.3
Registered electors		1,844		
Conservative hold		Swing		

Lavant (1 seat)
Party	Candidate	Votes	%	±%
Alliance	F. Heald	317	50.1	–4.4
Conservative	F. Longmore	316	49.9	+4.4
Turnout		633	45.0	–28.0
Registered electors		1,470		
Alliance hold		Swing		

Linchmere (1 seat)
Party	Candidate	Votes	%	±%
Conservative	R. Gibson	380	69.2	N/A
Alliance	S. Schlich	169	30.8	N/A
Turnout		549	43.0	N/A
Registered electors		1,205		
Conservative hold		Swing		

Lodsworth (1 seat)
Party	Candidate	Votes	%	±%
Conservative	R. Hancock	488	78.7	N/A
Ind. Conservative	C. Walsh	132	21.3	N/A
Turnout		620	42.0	N/A
Registered electors		1,509		
Conservative hold		Swing		

Midhurst (2 seats)
Party	Candidate	Votes	%	±%
Independent	P. Burne	880	36.3	+1.6
Conservative	J. Boulton	836	34.5	+8.2
Independent	D. Mott	706	29.1	N/A
Turnout		2,422	43.5	–31.3
Registered electors		3,545		
Independent hold		Swing		
Conservative gain from Ind. Conservative		Swing		

Oving (1 seat)
Party	Candidate	Votes	%	±%
Conservative	N. Best	522	72.3	+9.4
Alliance	O. Evans	126	17.5	N/A
Labour	B. Morrison	124	17.2	N/A
Turnout		722	47.0	–24.3
Registered electors		1,644		
Conservative hold		Swing		

Petworth (2 seats)
Party	Candidate	Votes	%	±%
Independent	J. Duncton	636	40.7	N/A
Conservative	R. Bill	465	59.3	N/A
Conservative	W. Mills	460		
Turnout		1,561	36.7	N/A
Registered electors		2,949		
Independent gain from Conservative		Swing		
Conservative hold		Swing		

Plaistow (2 seats)
Party	Candidate	Votes	%	±
Conservative	P. Luttman-Johnson	Unopposed		
Conservative	T. Micklem	Unopposed		
Turnout		0	0.0	N/A
Registered electors		3,100		
Conservative hold				
Conservative hold				

Rogate (1 seat)
Party	Candidate	Votes	%	±%
Conservative	P. Janes	433	52.6	–23.1
Alliance	K. Campbell	319	38.8	N/A
Independent	A. Jackson	71	8.6	–15.7
Turnout		823	53.3	–21.8
Registered electors		1,468		
Conservative hold		Swing		

Selsey North (2 seats)
Party	Candidate	Votes	%	±%
Conservative	M. Cox	557	62.9	N/A
Conservative	I. Gibbons	543		
Alliance	J. Ratcliff	405	23.2	N/A
Independent	D. Hammond	243	13.9	N/A
Turnout		1,748	31.0	N/A
Registered electors		3,477		
Conservative hold		Swing		
Conservative hold		Swing		

Selsey South (2 seats)
Party	Candidate	Votes	%	±%
Conservative	J. Whiteman	640	52.5	+3.3
Conservative	F. Bavister	593		
Independent	A. Ogden	400	17.0	N/A
Independent	P. Hammond	360	15.3	N/A
Independent	H. Van Raat	355	15.1	N/A
Turnout		2,348	39.0	–35.9
Registered electors		3,314		
Conservative gain from Ind. Conservative		Swing		
Conservative hold		Swing		

Sidlesham (1 seat)
Party	Candidate	Votes	%	±
Independent	A. Petrie-Hay	Unopposed		
Turnout		0	0.0	N/A
Registered electors		950		
Independent hold				

Southbourne (3 seats)
Party	Candidate	Votes	%	±%
Residents	I. Sutherland	1,341	67.4	+5.0
Residents	C. Teece	1,256		
Alliance	A. Moss	827	21.5	N/A
Labour	R. Marsh	238	11.1	N/A
Labour	R. Morris	190		
Turnout		3,852	34.0	
Registered electors		4,862		
Residents hold		Swing		
Residents hold		Swing		
Alliance gain from Residents		Swing		

Stedham (1 seat)
Party	Candidate	Votes	%	±
Conservative	A. Burdett	Unopposed		
Turnout		0	0.0	N/A
Registered electors		1,576		
Conservative hold				

Stoughton (1 seat)
Party	Candidate	Votes	%	±
Independent	J. Mann	Unopposed		
Turnout		0	0.0	N/A
Registered electors		1,324		
Independent hold				

West Wittering (1 seat)
Party	Candidate	Votes	%	±
Conservative	H. Allen	Unopposed		
Turnout		0	0.0	N/A
Registered electors		2,429		
Conservative hold				

Westbourne (1 seat)
Party	Candidate	Votes	%	±%
Conservative	S. Bray	402	51.0	–3.6
Alliance	C. Jones	386	49.0	+3.6
Turnout		788	52.0	–21.7
Registered electors		1,504		
Conservative hold		Swing		

Wisborough Green (1 seat)
Party	Candidate	Votes	%	±
Conservative	J. Illius	Unopposed		
Turnout		0	0.0	N/A
Registered electors		1,945		
Conservative hold				
