= Woolbeding =

Village and parish in West Sussex, England

Coordinates: 50.998°N 0.758°W

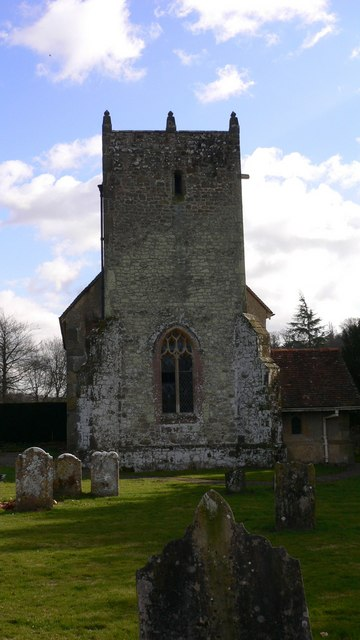
- All Hallows Church

- Location within West Sussex
- Area: 7.29 km^{2} (2.81 sq mi)
- Population: 147. 2011 Census
  - Density: 22/km^{2} (57/sq mi)
- OS grid reference: SU872228
  - London: 44 miles (71 km) NE
- Civil parish: Woolbeding with Redford
- District: Chichester
- Shire county: West Sussex
- Region: South East
- Country: England
- Sovereign state: United Kingdom
- Post town: Midhurst
- Postcode district: GU29
- Dialling code: 01730
- Police: Sussex
- Fire: West Sussex
- Ambulance: South East Coast
- UK Parliament: Chichester

Woolbeding is a village and ecclesiastical parish in the District of Chichester in West Sussex, England, 1 mile (1.6 km) north-west of Midhurst and north of the River Rother and A272 road.

The civil parish of Woolbeding with Redford has a land area of 1,801 acres (729 ha). The 2001 census recorded 158 people living in 70 households, of whom 83 were economically active.

== History ==
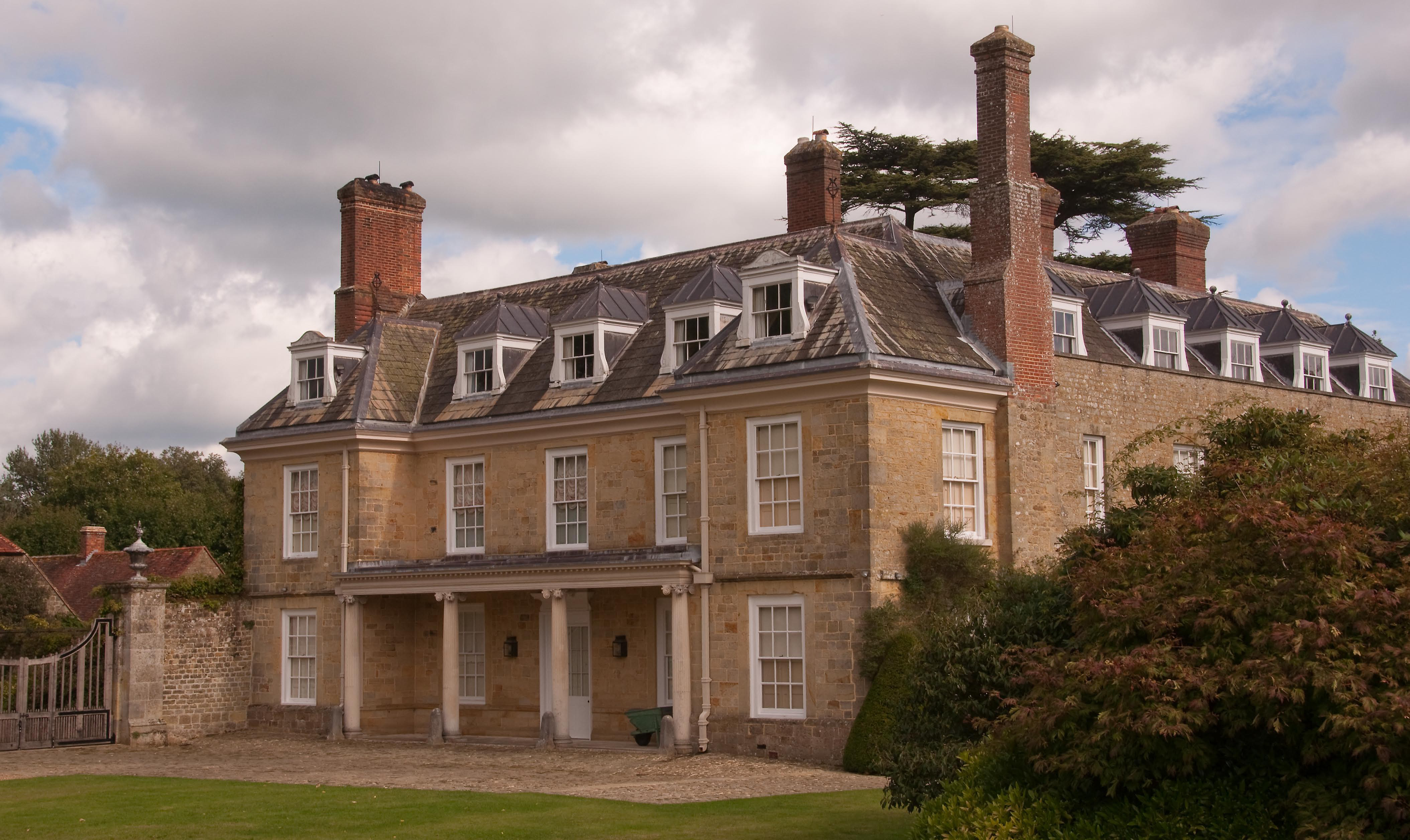
Woolbeding House

Woolbeding was listed in the Domesday Book of 1086 in the ancient hundred of Easebourne as having 24 households: 14 villagers, 5 smallholders and five slaves; with woodland, ploughing land, meadows, a mill and church, it had a value to the lord of the manor of £6.

Woolbeding Bridge across the River Rother is a medieval one, with three arches and two cutwaters.

The large 18th-century country house, Woolbeding House, is a Grade I listed building. It was the home of the late Simon Sainsbury of the Sainsbury supermarket family.

The National Trust owns the Woolbeding Estate, which includes Woolbeding and Pound Commons which are Sites of Special Scientific Interest.

Telegraph Hill, 1 mile (1.6 km) from Woolbeding, was the site of a station on the semaphore line from London to Portsmouth which operated from 1822 to 1847. It was previously called "Holder" or "Older" Hill.

In 1861, the parish's area was 2,253 acres (912 ha), with a population of 338.

== Parish church ==
All Hallows parish church is a Grade I listed building. The oldest parts of the church are Saxon. The tower is small, with eight short pinnacles in a vaguely medieval style. It was built in 1728 but it has lancet windows that look like re-used Saxon or Norman ones. The present chancel is Gothic Revival and was built in 1870 but the nave has tall Anglo-Saxon proportions, with plain pilasters from ground to roof, and a blocked doorway. There are more pilasters on the north wall, including a truncated one with traces of a filled-in window above it. The quoins are of large stones. These features suggest a Saxon date for the main body of the church.

Inside the church is a wall monument to Lady Dame Margaret Mill, wife of Sir Richard Mill of Woolbeding, daughter of Robert Knollys, Esq., of "Grove Place, Co. Southampton", died 1744, aged 56. The coat of arms shown is Per fesse Argent and Sable, a pale, and three bears salient, two and one, counterchanged, muzzled and chained Or, impaling Gules, on a chevron Argent three roses of the field, a canton Argent (recte: Ermine).

Next to a wall that separates the churchyard from the grounds of the manor house is a miniature mausoleum with Tuscan columns and square pilasters, with a frieze of military trophies such as pikes, rifles, cannon, battleaxes, drums and a helmet. There is a line of ancient yew trees near the church.

== Woolbeding poets ==
The English Romantic poet Charlotte Turner Smith lived at Woolbeding House in the mid-1780s.

Two poets grew up in the parish, each the son of a Rector of All Hallows parish, but in different centuries: Thomas Otway (1652-1685) and Francis William Bourdillon (1852-1921); whose father was Rector from 1855 to 1875.

== Sources ==
- Nairn, Ian; Pevsner, Nikolaus (1965). Sussex. The Buildings of England. Harmondsworth: Penguin Books. pp. 385–386. ISBN 0 14 071028 0.

| Next station upwards | Admiralty Semaphore line 1822 | Next station downwards |
| Haste Hill | Holder Hill | Beacon Hill |
