= Jess Brown-Fuller =

British politician

Jess Brown-Fuller MP
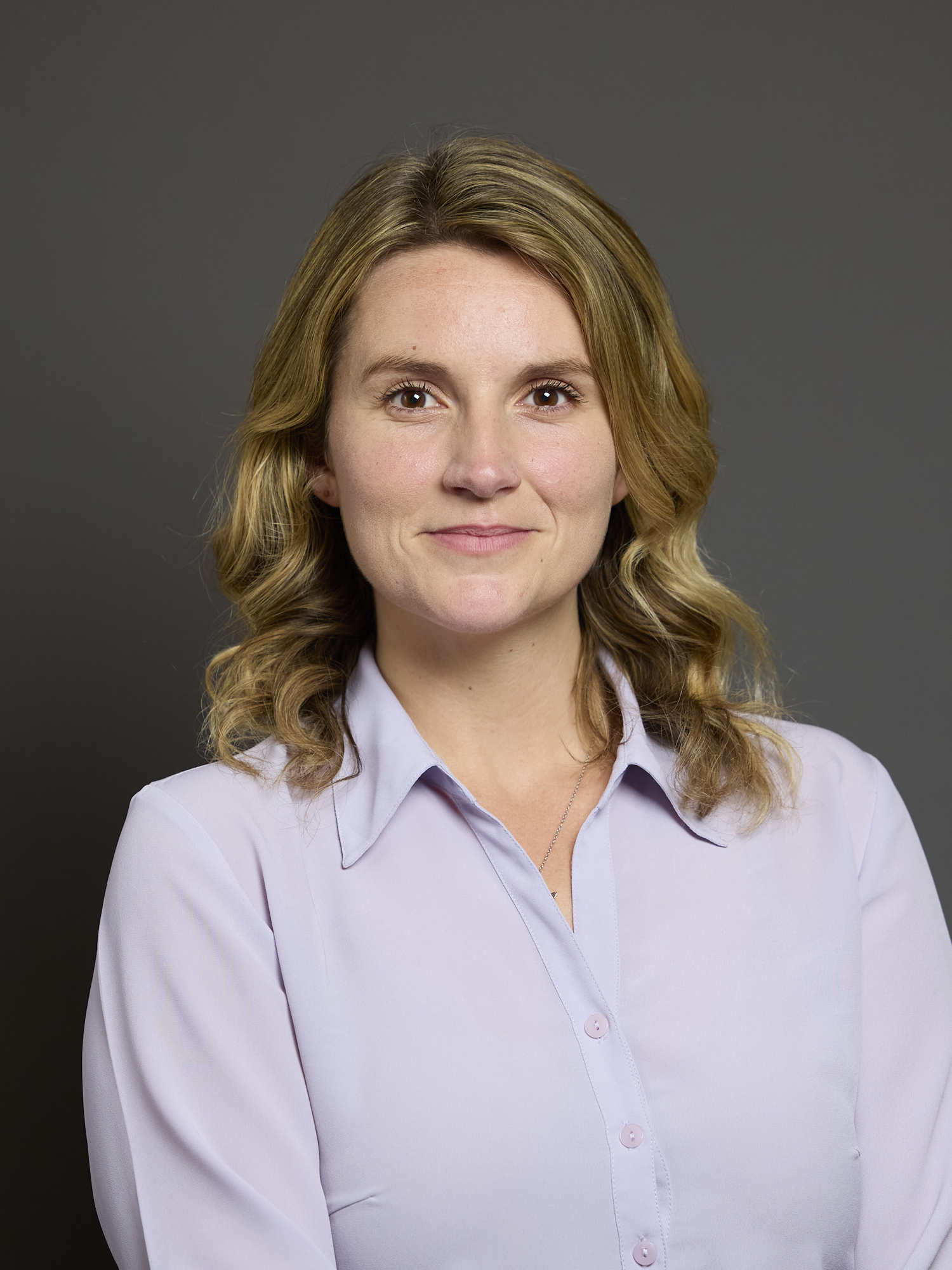
- Official portrait, 2024

Member of Parliament for Chichester
- Incumbent
- Assumed office 4 July 2024
- Preceded by: Gillian Keegan
- Majority: 12,172 (23.5%)

Liberal Democrat portfolios
- 2024–2025: Hospitals and Primary Care
- 2025–present: Justice

Member of Chichester District Council for Midhurst
- In office 8 May 2023 – 11 March 2025
- Preceded by: Gordon McAra
- Succeeded by: Dominic Merritt

Personal details
- Born: August 1990 (age 36) Norwich, Norfolk, England
- Party: Liberal Democrats
- Education: University of Chichester

Jessica Sian Louise Brown-Fuller (born August 1990) is a British Liberal Democrat politician. Since 2024, she has been Member of Parliament (MP) for Chichester; she is the first non-Conservative MP for the constituency since 1924.

== Early life ==
Brown-Fuller was born in Norwich, Norfolk, to a Londoner father and a Welsh mother. The family moved to West Sussex in the 1990s for her mother's career. Brown-Fuller graduated from the University of Chichester's Department of Theatre in 2013 with a performing arts degree.

== Political career ==
Brown-Fuller has been the events officer for Midhurst Town Council. She was formerly a member of Chichester District Council, first elected in the 2023 council election.

Brown-Fuller was elected as Member of Parliament for Chichester in the 2024 general election, defeating Gillian Keegan, the education secretary.

She is the Liberal Democrat Spokesperson for Justice. Brown-Fuller has served as the Co-Chair of the All-Party Parliamentary Group on Formula One and Motorsport.

== Personal life ==
Brown-Fuller lives in Midhurst with her husband and their two children.

Before being elected as a Councillor, and subsequently a Member of Parliament, she opened a restaurant in Midhurst, which was permanently closed after a fire in a neighbouring building severely damaged the property.

Parliament of the United Kingdom
Preceded by Gillian Keegan	Member of Parliament for Chichester; 2024–present	Incumbent
