= Harbour Villages =

Electoral ward in West Sussex, England

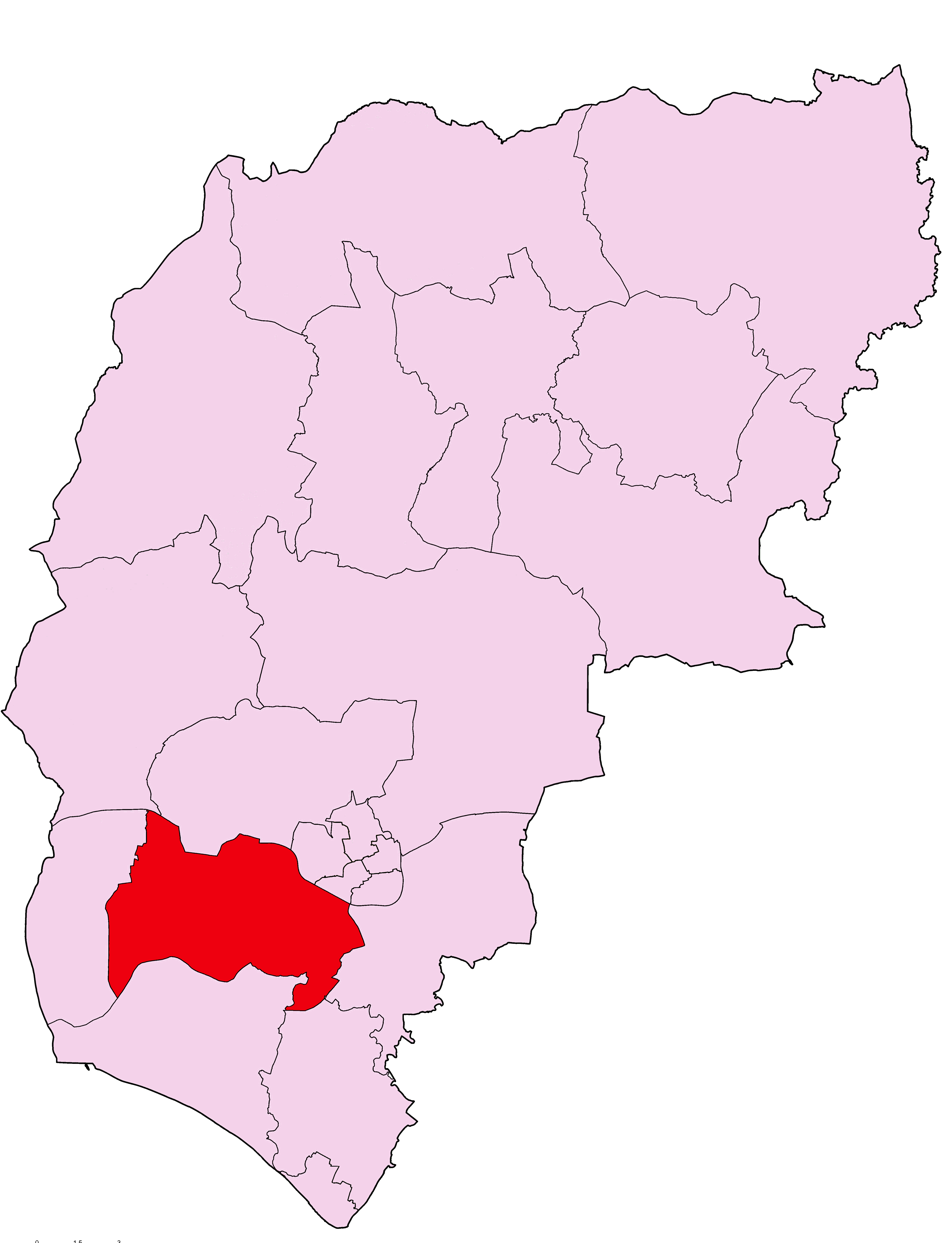
- Shown within Chichester
- Population: 8,166 (2023)
- District: Chichester
- Ceremonial county: West Sussex
- Country: England
- Sovereign state: United Kingdom
- UK Parliament: Chichester
- Councillors: Adrian Moss (LD); Richard Bates (LD); Stephen Johnson (LD)

Harbour Villages is an electoral ward of Chichester District, West Sussex, England and returns three members to sit on Chichester District Council.

Following a district boundary review, Harbour Villages was created from the Bosham, Donnington, Fishbourne and Southbourne wards in 2019.

== Councillor ==
Year	Member	Party	Member	Party	Member	Party
2023	Adrian Moss	Liberal Democrat	Stephen Johnson	Liberal Democrat	Richard Bates	Liberal Democrat

== Election results ==
Chichester District Council Election 2023: Harbour Villages
Party	Candidate	Votes	%	±%
Liberal Democrats	Adrian Geoffrey Frank Moss	2,342	22.7	+3.9
Liberal Democrats	Richard Alexander Bates	2,257	21.9	+8.4
Liberal Democrats	Philip Stephen Kemble Johnson	2,066	19.6	+7.7
Conservative	Penelope Clare Plant	855	8.3	–4.5
Conservative	Sandra Simone James	755	7.3	–4.7
Green	Georgina Caroline Armour Glasius	705	6.8	–3.6
Conservative	Jane Louise Kilby	690	6.7	–4.1
Independent	Kevin Nigel Arthur Mann	341	3.6	+3.6
Labour	Susan Joan Walsh	309	3	–0.6
Turnout		10,320	45.16	+3.0
Liberal Democrats hold		Swing	+3.9	
Liberal Democrats hold		Swing	+8.4	
Liberal Democrats gain from Conservative		Swing	+7.7	

Chichester District Council Election 2019: Harbour Villages
Party	Candidate	Votes	%	±%
Liberal Democrats	Adrian Geoffrey Frank Moss	1,739	18.8	
Liberal Democrats	David John Alwin Rodgers	1,247	13.5	
Conservative	Penelope Clare Plant	1,178	12.8	
Liberal Democrats	David Conrad Mackintosh	1,138	12.3	
Conservative	Andrew Charles Collins	1,107	12.0	
Conservative	Michael Brian Dicker	996	10.8	
Green	Michael John Neville	961	10.4	
Labour	Jane Anne Towers	329	3.6	
Labour	Stephen John Gough	256	2.8	
Labour	Jane Loveda Turton	235	2.5	
Turnout		9,234	42.19	
Liberal Democrats hold		Swing		
Liberal Democrats gain from Conservative		Swing		
Conservative hold		Swing		
