= The Witterings (ward) =

Electoral ward in West Sussex, England

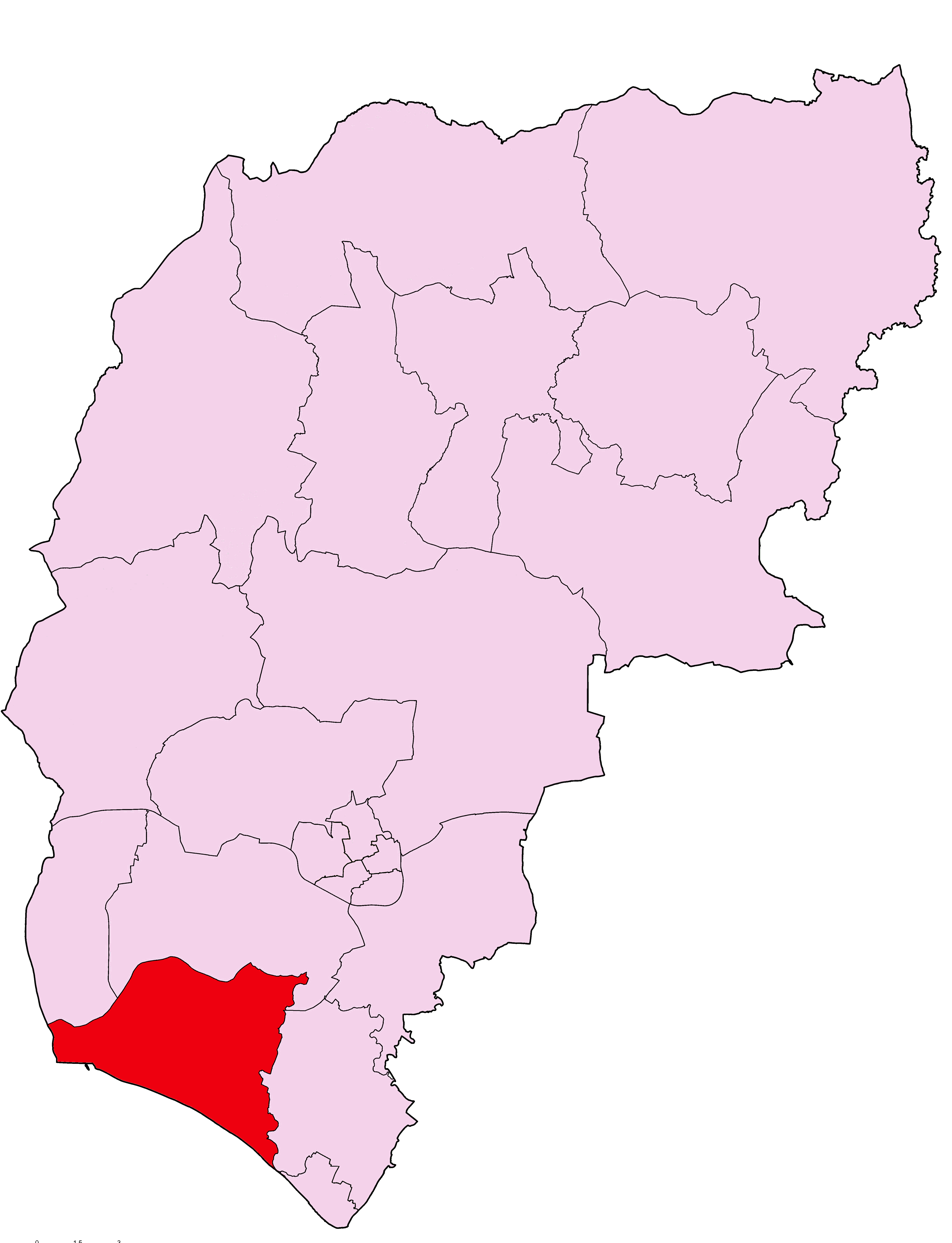
- Shown within Chichester
- Population: 8,059 (2019)
- District: Chichester
- Ceremonial county: West Sussex
- Country: England
- Sovereign state: United Kingdom
- UK Parliament: Chichester
- Councillors: Graeme Barrett (C); Elizabeth Hamilton (C); Susan Taylor (C)

The Witterings is an electoral ward of Chichester District, West Sussex, England and returns three members to sit on Chichester District Council.

Following a district boundary review, The Witterings was created from the East Wittering and West Wittering wards in 2019.

== Councillor ==
Year	Member	Party	Member	Party	Member	Party
2019	Graeme Barrett	Conservative	Elizabeth Hamilton	Conservative	Susan Taylor	Conservative

== Election results ==
Chichester District Council election 2019: The Witterings
Party	Candidate	Votes	%	±%
Conservative	Graeme Arthur Frederick Barrett	1,309	17.4	
Conservative	Elizabeth Angela Booth Hamilton	1,191	15.8	
Conservative	Susan Therese Taylor	1,003	13.3	
Liberal Democrats	Margaret Joanna Gormley	744	9.9	
Liberal Democrats	Susan Elizabeth Milnes	703	9.3	
Green	Stephanie Grace Carn	592	7.9	
Independent	Laurence Pocock	577	7.7	
UKIP	Jonathan Bowman	396	5.3	
UKIP	Maureen Patricia Hunt	347	4.6	
Independent	Martin John Silcocks	336	4.5	
Labour	Patrick Joseph O'Sullivan	314	4.2	
Turnout		7,536	36.58	
Conservative hold		Swing		
Conservative hold		Swing		
Conservative gain from Independent		Swing		
