= Bosham (ward) =

- Shown within Chichester
- Population: 3,404 (2007)
- District: Chichester
- Ceremonial county: West Sussex
- Country: England
- Sovereign state: United Kingdom
- UK Parliament: Chichester

Bosham was an electoral ward of Chichester District, West Sussex, England that returned two members to sit on Chichester District Council.

Following a district boundary review, it was merged into the new Harbour Villages ward in 2019.

== Councillors ==
Year	Member	Party	Member	Party
2007	David Myers	Conservative	Myles Cullen	Conservative

== Election results ==
Chichester District Council Election 2007: Bosham
Party	Candidate	Votes	%	±%
Conservative	David John Myers*	848	33.44	
Conservative	Myles Antony Cullen*	846	33.36	
Independent	Cliff Archer	628	24.76	
UKIP	Alicia Ruth Denny	113	4.46	
UKIP	Douglas Denny	101	3.98	
Total votes		2536		
Turnout		1471	43.21	

* Elected
