= Woolbeding and Pound Commons =

Protected area in West Sussex, England

Coordinates: 51.022°N 0.964°W

- Site of Special Scientific Interest
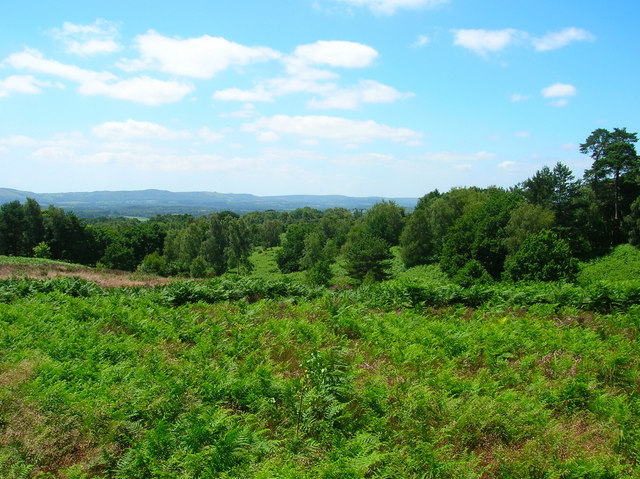
- Location of Woolbeding and Pound Commons.
- Area of search: West Sussex
- Grid reference: SU 868 255
- Interest: Biological
- Area: 171.9 hectares (425 acres)
- Notification date: 1998
- Location map: Magic Map

Woolbeding and Pound Commons is a 171.9-hectare (425-acre) biological Site of Special Scientific Interest north of Midhurst in West Sussex.

The commons have areas of wet and dry heath, woodland, ponds and wet flushes. Invertebrates include a number of Red Data Book species, such as the bee Hylaeus gibbus, the Eumenes coarctatus and Psen bruxellensis wasps and the click-beetle Hylis olexai. The site also provides a habitat for three rare birds, woodlark, nightjar and Dartford warbler.

The site is crossed by roads and footpaths.
