= Donnington (Chichester District Council ward) =

- Shown within Chichester
- Population: 1,804 (2007)
- District: Chichester
- Ceremonial county: West Sussex
- Country: England
- Sovereign state: United Kingdom
- UK Parliament: Chichester

Donnington was an electoral ward of Chichester District, West Sussex, England that returned one member to sit on Chichester District Council.

Following a district boundary review, it was merged into the new Harbour Villages ward in 2019.

== Councillor ==
Election	Member	Party
2007	John Ridd	Conservative

== Election results ==
Chichester District Council Election 2007: Donnington
Party	Candidate	Votes	%	±%
Conservative	John Ridd*	528	67.35	
Liberal Democrats	Alan George Wells	256	32.65	
Turnout		784	43.57	

* Elected
