= 2023 Chichester District Council election =

Local election in England

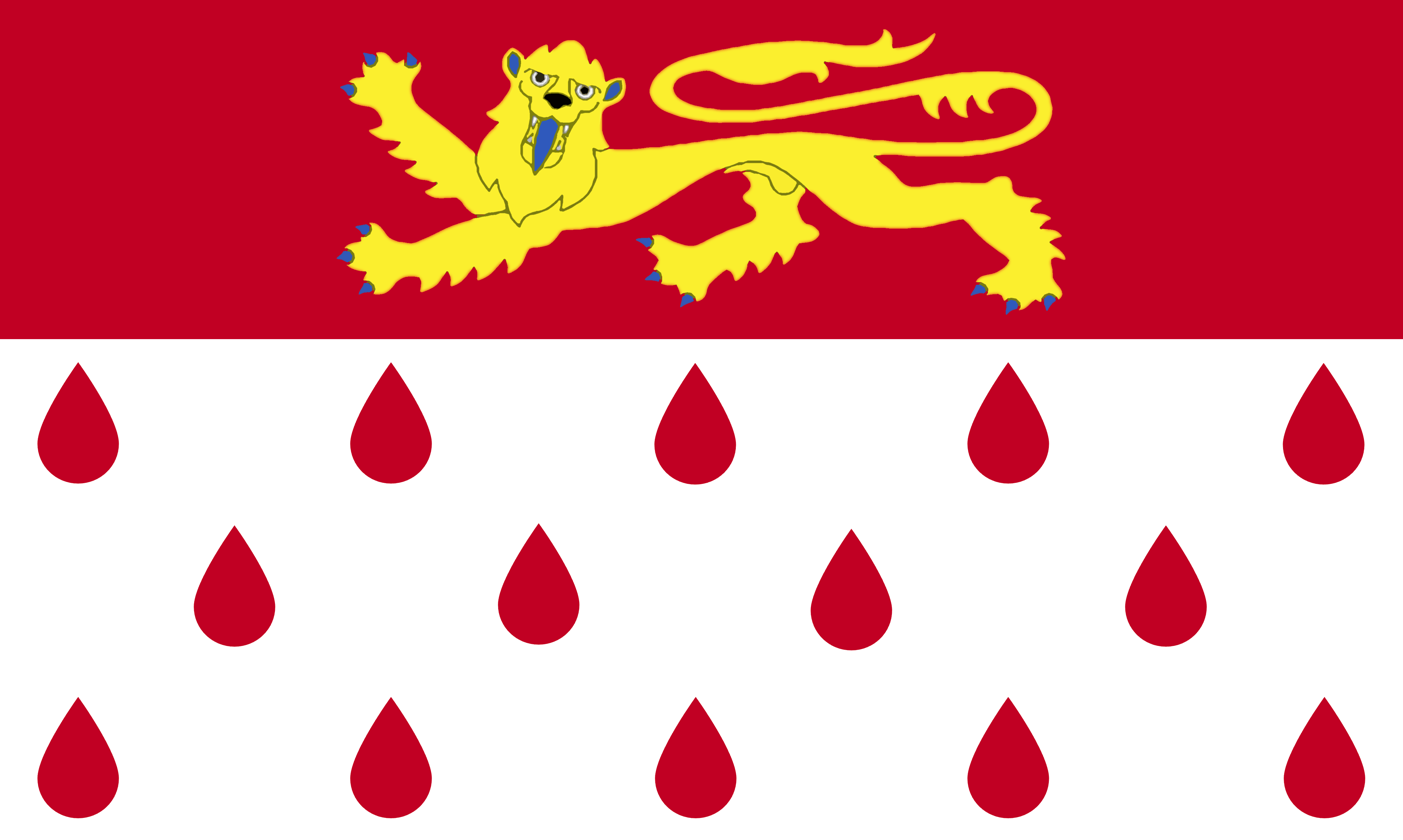
- 4 May 2023

All 36 seats to Chichester District Council 19 seats needed for a majority
	First party	Second party	Third party
Leader	Adrian Moss	Eileen Lintill	Tim Johnson
Party	Liberal Democrats	Conservative	Local Alliance
Last election	11 seats, 33.3%	18 seats, 42.0%	2 seats, 2.6%
Seats before	11	17	2
Seats won	25	5	4
Seat change	▲14	▼13	▲2
Popular vote	32,691	19,843	2,603
Percentage	50.9%	30.9%	4.1%
Swing	▲17.6%	▼19.1%	▲1.5%
	Fourth party	Fifth party	Sixth party
Party	Green	Labour	Independent
Last election	2 seats, 8.4%	2 seats, 6.7%	1 seat, 4.1%
Seats before	2	1	3
Seats won	2	0	0
Seat change	Steady	▼2	▼1
Popular vote	4,318	3,444	932
Percentage	6.7%	5.4%	1.5%
Swing	▲1.1%	▼0.2%	▼2.6%
- Winner of each seat at the 2023 Chichester District Council election.
Leader before election
Eileen Lintill
Conservative
No overall control
Leader after election
Adrian Moss
Liberal Democrats

The 2023 Chichester District Council election was held on 4 May 2023 to elect members to Chichester District Council in West Sussex, England. The election took place on the same day as other local elections.

The whole council was up for election, having previously been under no overall control and led by a Conservative minority administration. The Conservative leader of the council prior to the election, Eileen Lintill, did not stand for re-election. The Liberal Democrats won 25 seats, the first time that the party (or any other than the Conservative Party) secured a majority on Chichester District Council. Liberal Democrat group leader Adrian Moss was appointed as the new leader of the council at the subsequent annual council meeting on 17 May 2023.

== Summary ==
=== Election result ===
2023 Chichester District Council election
Party	Candidates	Seats	Gains	Losses	Net gain/loss	Seats %	Votes %	Votes	+/−
Liberal Democrats	32	25	14	0	▲14	69.4	50.9	32,691	+17.6
Conservative	36	5	0	13	▼13	13.8	30.9	19,843	-19.1
Local Alliance	4	4	2	0	▲2	11.1	4.1	2,603	+1.5
Green	12	2	0	0	Steady	5.5	6.7	4,318	+1.1
Labour	17	0	0	2	▼2	0.0	5.4	3,444	-0.2
Reform	2	0	0	0	Steady	0.0	0.4	226	N/A
Patria Party	1	0	0	0	Steady	0.0	0.1	92	±0.0
Heritage	1	0	0	0	Steady	0.0	0.1	68	N/A
Independent	2	0	0	1	▼1	0.0	1.5	932	-2.6

↓
25	5	4	2
Liberal Democrats	Conservative	LA	Green

== Ward results ==
The results for each ward were as follows, with an asterisk (*) indicating an incumbent councillor standing for re-election:

=== Chichester Central ===
Chichester Central
Party	Candidate	Votes	%	±%
Liberal Democrats	James Vivian	404	46.0	▲5.9
Conservative	Nicholas Roberts	275	31.3	▼13.0
Labour	James Field	107	12.2	▼0.3
Green	Mark Record	92	10.5	▲10.5
Majority		129	14.7	N/A
Turnout		889	41.3	
Rejected ballots		11	1.2	
Registered electors		2,148		
Liberal Democrats gain from Conservative		Swing	▲9.5	

=== Chichester East ===
Chichester East
Party	Candidate	Votes	%	±%
Liberal Democrats	Bill Brisbane*	705	58.8	▲38.1
Liberal Democrats	Rhys Chant	613	51.1	▲33.1
Labour	Colin Sandbach	353	29.5	▼4.3
Labour	Clare Walsh	348	29.0	▼3.3
Conservative	Peter Beveridge	286	23.9	▼3.9
Patria	Andrew Emerson	92	7.7	▲7.7
Majority		352	29.4	N/A
Majority		265	22.1	N/A
Turnout			30.9	
Rejected ballots		6	0.5	
Registered electors		4,295		
Liberal Democrats gain from Labour		Swing	▲21.2	
Liberal Democrats gain from Labour		Swing	▲18.2	

=== Chichester North ===
Chichester North
Party	Candidate	Votes	%	±%
Liberal Democrats	Maureen Corfield	1,280	67.6	▲29.2
Liberal Democrats	Jonathan Brown*	1,255	66.3	▲31.9
Conservative	Alison Griffiths	462	24.4	▼13.9
Conservative	Giles Thompson	448	23.7	▼12.3
Labour	Olivia Connolly	280	14.8	▲1.3
Heritage	Teri Grieve	68	3.6	▲3.6
Majority		818	43.2	▲40.8
Majority		807	42.6	N/A
Turnout			44.3	
Rejected ballots		9	0.5	
Registered electors		4,506		
Liberal Democrats hold		Swing	▲21.6	
Liberal Democrats gain from Conservative		Swing	▲22.1	

=== Chichester South ===
Chichester South
Party	Candidate	Votes	%	±%
Green	Sarah Sharp*	1,287	83.6	▲22.2
Green	Timothy Young	943	61.2	▲18.2
Liberal Democrats	Joanne Kondabeka	303	19.7	▲5.5
Labour	Gareth Hitchman	281	18.2	▲6.6
Conservative	Simon Bailey	266	17.3	▼2.8
Majority		984	63.9	▲22.6
Majority		662	43.0	▲30.0
Turnout			34.2	
Rejected ballots		13	0.7	
Registered electors		5,087		
Green hold		Swing	▲8.4	
Green hold		Swing	▲5.8	

=== Chichester West ===
Chichester West
Party	Candidate	Votes	%	±%
Liberal Democrats	Clare Apel*	1,554	71.1	▲15.3
Liberal Democrats	Sarah Quail	1,403	64.2	▲20.6
Conservative	Simon Lloyd-Williams	549	25.1	▼1.2
Conservative	David Millican	540	24.7	▲0.3
Labour	Adam Fyfe	325	14.9	▲3.7
Majority		1005	46.0	▲16.5
Majority		863	39.5	▲20.3
Turnout			42.3	
Rejected ballots		15	0.7	
Registered electors		5,094		
Liberal Democrats hold		Swing	▲8.3	
Liberal Democrats hold		Swing	▲10.2	

=== Easebourne ===
Easebourne
Party	Candidate	Votes	%	±%
Conservative	Erik Hobbs*	534	58.2	▼5.5
Liberal Democrats	Carl Keeling	243	26.5	▼7.6
Green	Leo Homewood	76	8.3	▲8.3
Labour	Gordon Churchill	65	7.1	▲7.1
Majority		291	31.7	▲2.1
Turnout		919	38.0	
Rejected ballots		1	0.1	
Registered electors		2,411		
Conservative hold		Swing	▲1.1	

=== Fernhurst ===
Fernhurst
Party	Candidate	Votes	%	±%
Liberal Democrats	Eleanora Newbery	892	69.4	▲29.2
Conservative	Brett Burkhart	853	66.4	▲9.9
Conservative	Peter Wilding*	825	64.2	▲10.4
Majority		67	5.2	N/A
Majority		N/A	N/A	N/A
Turnout			33.8	
Rejected ballots		29	1.7	
Registered electors		5,087		
Liberal Democrats gain from Conservative		Swing	▲9.4	
Conservative hold		Swing	N/A	

=== Fittleworth ===
Fittleworth
Party	Candidate	Votes	%	±%
Liberal Democrats	John Cross	534	47.5	▲17.0
Conservative	Alan Sutton*	506	45.0	▼21.8
Green	David Ross	84	7.5	▲7.5
Majority		28	2.5	N/A
Turnout		1128	44.4	
Rejected ballots		4	0.4	
Registered electors		2,538		
Liberal Democrats gain from Conservative		Swing	▲19.4	

=== Goodwood ===
Goodwood
Party	Candidate	Votes	%	±%
Conservative	Henry Potter*	450	47.1	▼4.9
Liberal Democrats	Jack Lovejoy	283	29.6	▲8.0
Green	Philip Maber	222	23.2	▼1.4
Majority		167	17.5	▼9.9
Turnout		963	33.6	
Rejected ballots		8	0.8	
Registered electors		2,855		
Conservative hold		Swing	▼6.5	

=== Harbour Villages ===
Harbour Villages
Party	Candidate	Votes	%	±%
Liberal Democrats	Adrian Moss*	2,342	68.1	▲16.1
Liberal Democrats	Richard Bates	2,257	65.6	▲28.3
Liberal Democrats	Philip Johnson	2,066	60.1	▲26.1
Conservative	Penelope Plant	855	24.9	▼10.3
Conservative	Sandra James	755	21.9	▼11.2
Green	Georgina Armour Glasius	705	20.5	▼8.2
Conservative	Jane Kilby	690	20.1	▼9.7
Independent	Kevin Mann	341	9.9	▲9.9
Labour	Susan Walsh	309	9.0	▼0.8
Majority		1487	43.2	▲24.3
Majority		1502	43.7	▲36.2
Majority		1361	39.6	N/A
Turnout			45.2	
Rejected ballots		2	0.1	
Registered electors		8,166		
Liberal Democrats hold		Swing	▲13.2	
Liberal Democrats hold		Swing	▲19.8	
Liberal Democrats gain from Conservative		Swing	▲17.9	

=== Harting ===
Harting
Party	Candidate	Votes	%	±%
Liberal Democrats	Timothy O'Kelly	942	76.5	▲2.4
Conservative	Robert Hall	289	23.5	▼0.4
Majority		653	53.0	▲2.8
Turnout		1241	43.8	
Rejected ballots		10	0.8	
Registered electors		2,832		
Liberal Democrats hold		Swing	▲1.4	

=== Lavant ===
Lavant
Party	Candidate	Votes	%	±%
Liberal Democrats	Joseph Brookes-Harmer	475	45.8	▲16.6
Conservative	David Palmer*	457	44.1	▼14.3
Labour	Rhiannon Brome Thompson	105	10.1	▼0.2
Majority		18	1.7	N/A
Turnout		1044	40.6	
Rejected ballots		7	0.7	
Registered electors		2,570		
Liberal Democrats gain from Conservative		Swing	▲15.5	

=== Loxwood ===
Loxwood
Party	Candidate	Votes	%	±%
Liberal Democrats	Gareth Evans*	1,805	78.4	▲22.9
Liberal Democrats	Charles Todhunter	1,556	67.6	▲19.8
Conservative	Paul North	711	30.9	▼13.4
Conservative	Steven Waight	530	23.0	▼16.8
Majority		1094	47.5	▲36.3
Majority		1026	44.6	▲36.8
Turnout			42.8	
Rejected ballots		9		
Registered electors				
Liberal Democrats hold		Swing	▲18.2	
Liberal Democrats gain from Conservative		Swing	▲18.3	

=== Midhurst ===
Midhurst
Party	Candidate	Votes	%	±%
Liberal Democrats	Jessica Brown-Fuller	1,326	64.9	▲33.8
Liberal Democrats	Hannah Burton	1,112	54.4	▲38.7
Conservative	Thomas Richardson	817	40.0	▲10.3
Conservative	Nicola Holben	694	34.0	▲8.2
Labour	Alasdair Fraser	138	6.8	▼3.8
Majority		509	24.9	N/A
Majority		418	20.5	▲15.2
Turnout			39.0	
Rejected ballots		9	0.4	
Registered electors		5,571		
Liberal Democrats gain from Independent		Swing	▲11.8	
Liberal Democrats hold		Swing	▲15.3	

=== North Mundham and Tangmere ===
North Mundham and Tangmere
Party	Candidate	Votes	%	±%
Liberal Democrats	David Betts	1,123	66.6	▲14.0
Liberal Democrats	Charles Hastain	880	52.2	▲52.2
Conservative	Simon Oakley*	649	38.5	▼12.5
Conservative	Terence O'Brien	468	27.7	▼16.5
Labour	Mark Todd	253	15.0	▲15.0
Majority		474	28.1	N/A
Majority		412	24.4	N/A
Turnout			32.5	
Rejected ballots		9	0.5	
Registered electors		5,731		
Liberal Democrats gain from Conservative		Swing	▲13.3	
Liberal Democrats gain from Conservative		Swing	▲34.4	

=== Petworth ===
Petworth
Party	Candidate	Votes	%	±%
Liberal Democrats	Harsha Desai	616	53.5	▲27.0
Conservative	Janet Duncton*	450	39.1	▼29.3
Labour	Jonathan Rodell	56	4.9	▼6.4
Green	Stephanie Carn	30	2.6	▲2.6
Majority		166	14.4	N/A
Turnout		1158	42.2	
Rejected ballots		6	0.5	
Registered electors		2,747		
Liberal Democrats gain from Conservative		Swing	▲28.2	

=== Selsey South ===
Selsey South
Party	Candidate	Votes	%	±%
Local Alliance	Timothy Johnson*	741	51.2	▼1.8
Local Alliance	Steven Boulcott	729	50.4	▲50.4
Conservative	Peter Barrow	479	33.1	▼15.0
Conservative	Colin Rickman	452	31.2	▼2.4
Green	Jack Olley	168	11.6	▲11.6
Labour	Heather Smith	153	10.6	▲1.0
Liberal Democrats	Jill Hilliard	119	8.2	▼9.1
Reform	Simon Edginton	54	3.7	▲3.7
Majority		262	18.1	▼1.3
Majority		277	19.1	N/A
Turnout			33.2	
Rejected ballots		9	0.6	
Registered electors		4,808		
Local Alliance hold		Swing	▲6.6	
Local Alliance gain from Conservative		Swing	▲26.4	

=== Sidlesham with Selsey North ===
Sidlesham with Selsey North
Party	Candidate	Votes	%	±%
Local Alliance	Donna Johnson*	631	47.9	▼1.5
Local Alliance	Valerie Weller	502	38.1	▲38.1
Conservative	Thomas Bromfield	457	34.7	▼9.9
Conservative	Nicholas Rose	448	34.0	▲2.8
Green	Andrew Swain	308	23.4	▼6.6
Liberal Democrats	Beth Meek	152	11.5	▼7.8
Labour	Philip White	135	10.3	▲10.3
Majority		174	13.2	▼5.0
Majority		54	4.1	N/A
Turnout			30.1	
Rejected ballots		7	0.5	
Registered electors		4,706		
Local Alliance hold		Swing	▲4.2	
Local Alliance gain from Conservative		Swing	▲20.5	

=== Southbourne ===
Southbourne
Party	Candidate	Votes	%	±%
Liberal Democrats	Tracie Bangert*	1,226	68.9	▲6.4
Liberal Democrats	Oona Hickson	1,034	58.1	▲3.9
Conservative	Jacob Sawkins	463	26.0	▼15.3
Conservative	Robert Gould	409	23.0	▼6.8
Green	Derrick Johnson	303	17.0	▲17.0
Labour	Sorcha Galvin	125	7.0	▲7.0
Majority		763	42.9	▲21.7
Majority		625	35.1	▲11.1
Turnout			34.0	
Rejected ballots		11	0.6	
Registered electors		5,642		
Liberal Democrats hold		Swing	▲10.9	
Liberal Democrats hold		Swing	▲5.4	

=== The Witterings ===
The Witterings
Party	Candidate	Votes	%	±%
Liberal Democrats	Mark Chilton	1,302	48.8	▲23.4
Liberal Democrats	Iain Ballantyne	1,234	46.3	▲22.3
Conservative	Elizabeth Hamilton*	1,118	41.9	▼2.9
Liberal Democrats	David Thompson	1,112	41.7	▲41.7
Conservative	Susan Taylor*	1,099	41.2	▲0.5
Conservative	Joanna El-Batal	996	37.4	▲3.1
No Description	Graeme Barrett*	591	22.2	▲22.2
Labour	Patrick O'Sullivan	374	14.0	▲3.3
Reform	Maureen Hunt	172	6.5	▲6.5
Majority		203	7.6	N/A
Majority		238	8.9	N/A
Majority		6	0.2	▼19.2
Turnout			37.0	
Rejected ballots		3	0.1	
Registered electors		8,104		
Liberal Democrats gain from Conservative		Swing	▲11.5	
Liberal Democrats gain from Conservative		Swing	▲9.6	
Conservative hold		Swing	▼22.3	

=== Westbourne ===
Westbourne
Party	Candidate	Votes	%	±%
Conservative	Roy Briscoe*	563	45.3	▼12.1
Liberal Democrats	Helen Penfold	543	43.7	▲24.6
Green	Ann Stewart	100	8.0	▼14.6
Labour	Luca Clark-Gutierrez	37	3.0	▲3.0
Majority		20	1.6	▼33.2
Turnout		1249	46.8	
Rejected ballots		6	0.5	
Registered electors		2,669		
Conservative hold		Swing	▼18.4	

== Changes 2023–present ==
- Joseph Brookes-Harmer (Lavant), elected as a Liberal Democrat, is listed by the council as an independent councillor.

=== By-elections ===
==== Midhurst ====
A by-election was held on 1 May 2025 following the resignation of Liberal Democrat councillor Jess Brown-Fuller, who had been elected as MP for Chichester in July 2024.

Midhurst by-election: 1 May 2025
Party	Candidate	Votes	%	±%
Liberal Democrats	Dominic Merritt	924	41.1	–17.0
Conservative	Danielle Dunfield-Prayero	712	31.7	–4.1
Reform	Adam Kirby	451	20.1	N/A
Green	Philip Maber	105	4.7	N/A
Labour	Juliette Reynolds	47	2.1	–3.9
Patria	Andrew Emerson	7	0.3	N/A
Majority		212	9.4	N/A
Turnout		2,246	39.3	+0.3
Registered electors		5,733		
Liberal Democrats hold		Swing	▼6.5	
