= East Wittering (ward) =

- Shown within Chichester
- Population: 4,079 (2008)
- District: Chichester
- Ceremonial county: West Sussex
- Country: England
- Sovereign state: United Kingdom
- UK Parliament: Chichester

East Wittering was an electoral ward of Chichester District, West Sussex, England that returns two members to sit on Chichester District Council.

Following a district boundary review, it was merged into the new The Witterings ward in 2019.

== Councillors ==
Year	Member	Party	Member	Party
2007	Peter Clementson	Conservative	Sevey Mastronardi	Conservative
2008	Peter Clementson	Conservative	Graeme Barrett	Conservative

== Election results ==
East Wittering by-election 2008
Party	Candidate	Votes	%	±%
Conservative	Graeme Barrett*	410	40.3	
Liberal Democrats	Mary Ellen Green	364	35.8	
BNP	Andrew Emerson	125	12.3	
Labour	Joe O'Sullivan	69	6.8	
UKIP	James McCulloch	49	4.8	
Turnout		1017	25.05	

* Elected

Chichester District Council election 2007: East Wittering
Party	Candidate	Votes	%	±%
Conservative	Sevey Mastronardi*	575	21.61	
Conservative	Peter Clementson*	574	21.57	
Independent	Bob Norris	517	19.44	
Liberal Democrats	Mary Ellen Green	491	18.46	
Liberal Democrats	Simon Green	381	14.33	
Labour	Joe O'Sullivan	122	4.59	
Total votes		2660		
Turnout		1531	38.06	

* Elected
