= Chichester West (ward) =

Electoral ward in West Sussex, England

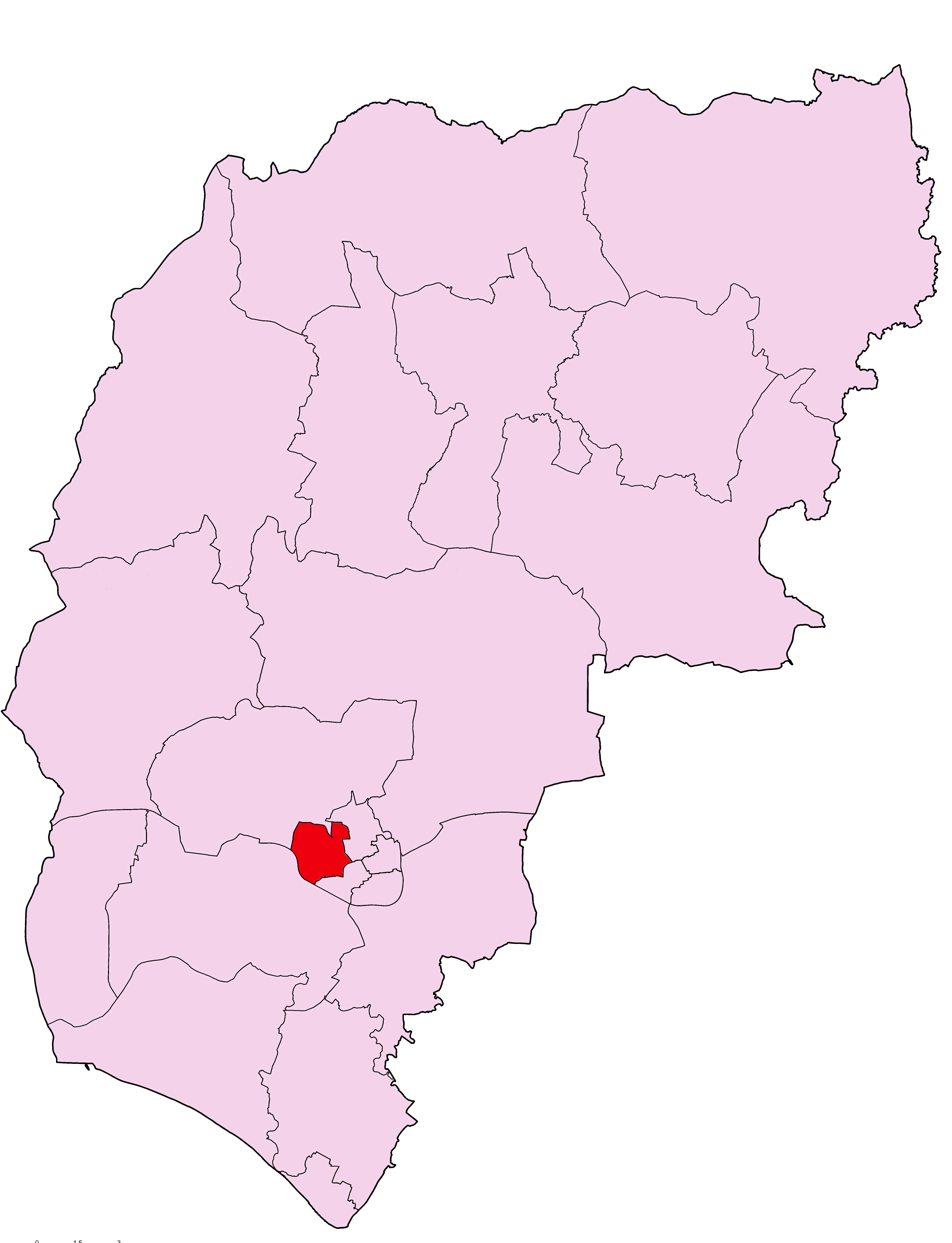
- Shown within Chichester
- Population: 4,830 (2019)
- District: Chichester
- Ceremonial county: West Sussex
- Country: England
- Sovereign state: United Kingdom
- UK Parliament: Chichester
- Councillors: Clare Apel (LD); John-Henry Bowden (LD)

Chichester West is an electoral ward of Chichester District, West Sussex, England and returns two members to sit on Chichester District Council.

== Councillors ==
Year	Member	Party	Member	Party
2019	Clare Apel	Liberal Democrat	John-Henry Bowden	Liberal Democrat
2015	Clare Apel	Liberal Democrat	Richard Plowman	Liberal Democrat
2011	Clare Apel	Liberal Democrat	Martyn Bell	Conservative
2007	Clare Apel	Liberal Democrat	Michael Shone	Liberal Democrat

== Election results ==
Chichester District Council Election 2019: Chichester West
Party	Candidate	Votes	%	±%
Liberal Democrats	Clare Margaret Mary Apel*	1,139	28.7	
Liberal Democrats	John-Henry David Bowden*	890	22.4	
Conservative	Simon Huw Peter Lloyd-Williams	538	13.6	
Conservative	Stephen Leon Hill	498	12.5	
Labour	James Douglas Hobson	228	5.7	
Labour	Aimie Jane Merrett	216	5.4	
Independent	Michael Clive Thorn	181	4.6	
UKIP	Michael Alan Hamilton Mason	177	4.5	
Patria	Andrew Emerson	84	2.1	
Turnout		3,970	42.71	
Liberal Democrats hold		Swing		
Liberal Democrats hold		Swing		

Chichester District Council Election 2007: Chichester West
Party	Candidate	Votes	%	±%
Liberal Democrats	Michael Raymond Shone*	649	22.35	
Liberal Democrats	Clare Apel*	646	22.24	
Conservative	Martyn John Bell	554	19.07	
Conservative	Margaret Whitehead	509	17.53	
BNP	Andrew Emerson	137	4.71	
BNP	Ray Lewis Fallick	110	3.78	
Labour	John Baker	102	3.51	
Labour	Catherine Mair Beach	102	3.51	
UKIP	James McCulloch	96	3.30	
Total votes		2905		
Turnout		1507	39.58	

* Elected
