= West Wittering (ward) =

- Shown within Chichester
- Population: 4,018 (2011)
- District: Chichester
- Ceremonial county: West Sussex
- Country: England
- Sovereign state: United Kingdom
- UK Parliament: Chichester

West Wittering was an electoral ward of Chichester District, West Sussex, England that returned two members to sit on Chichester District Council.

Following a district boundary review, it was merged into the new The Witterings ward in 2019.

== Councillors ==
Year	Member	Party	Member	Party
2011	Pieter Montyn	Conservative	Roger Marshall	Conservative

== Election results ==
Chichester District Council Election 2011: West Wittering
Party	Candidate	Votes	%	±%
Conservative	Pieter Montyn	1,348	36.1	
Conservative	Roger Marshall	1,299	34.8	
Independent	Steve Crossley	486	13.0	
Liberal Democrats	Roger Tilbury	361	9.7	
Labour	Gordon Churchill	243	6.5	
Total votes		3,737		
Turnout			51.47	5.91
Conservative hold		Swing		
Conservative hold		Swing		
