= Southbourne (ward) =

Electoral ward in West Sussex, England

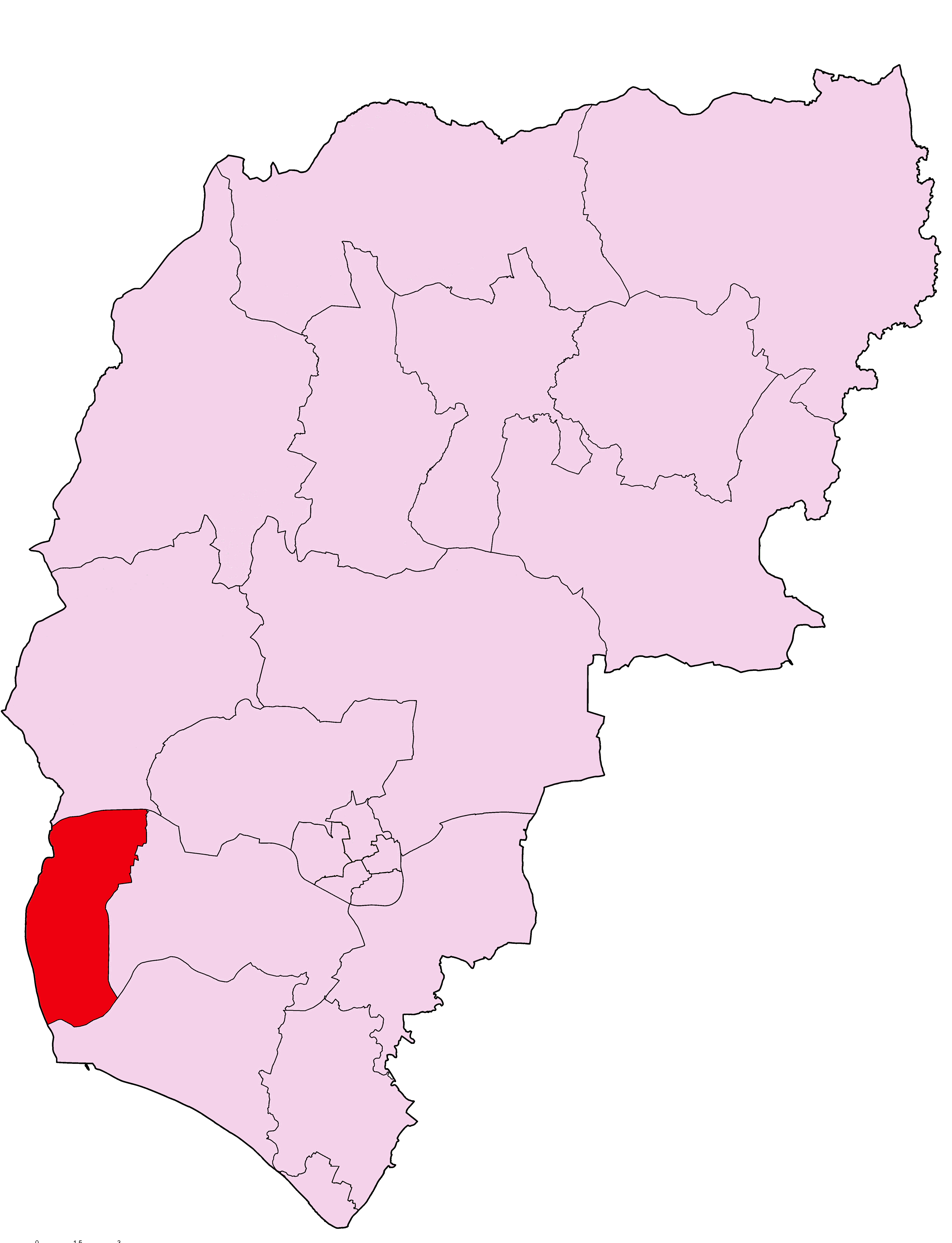
- Shown within Chichester
- Population: 5,275 (2019)
- District: Chichester
- Ceremonial county: West Sussex
- Country: England
- Sovereign state: United Kingdom
- UK Parliament: Chichester
- Councillors: Jonathan Brown (LD); Tracie Bangert (LD)

Southbourne is an electoral ward of Chichester District, West Sussex, England and returns two members to sit on Chichester District Council.

Following a district boundary review, part of the previous Southbourne boundaries were split into the new Harbour Villages ward in 2019.

== Councillors ==
Year	Member	Party	Member	Party	Member	Party
2019	Jonathan Brown	Liberal Democrats	Tracie Bangert	Liberal Democrats		
2015	Jonathan Brown	Liberal Democrats	Graham Hicks	Conservative	Robert Hayes	Conservative
2007	Mary Marrs	Conservative	Graham Hicks	Conservative	Robert Hayes	Conservative

== Election results ==
Chichester District Council Election 2019: Southbourne
Party	Candidate	Votes	%	±%
Liberal Democrats	Jonathan Andrew Brown*	1,018	32.7	
Liberal Democrats	Tracie Patricia Bangert*	884	28.4	
Conservative	Robert Hayes	674	21.7	
Conservative	Nigel Philip Hogben	492	15.8	
Turnout		3,111	31.77	
Liberal Democrats hold		Swing		
Liberal Democrats gain from Conservative		Swing		

Chichester District Council Election 2007: Southbourne
Party	Candidate	Votes	%	±%
Conservative	Graham Hicks*	970	18.60	
Conservative	Robert James Hayes*	961	18.43	
Conservative	Mary Marrs*	913	17.51	
Liberal Democrats	Barbara Gowlett	828	15.88	
Liberal Democrats	Roger Gowlett	827	15.86	
Liberal Democrats	Philip Charles MacDougall	716	13.72	
Total votes		5215		
Turnout		1862	33.81	

* Elected
