= Midhurst (ward) =

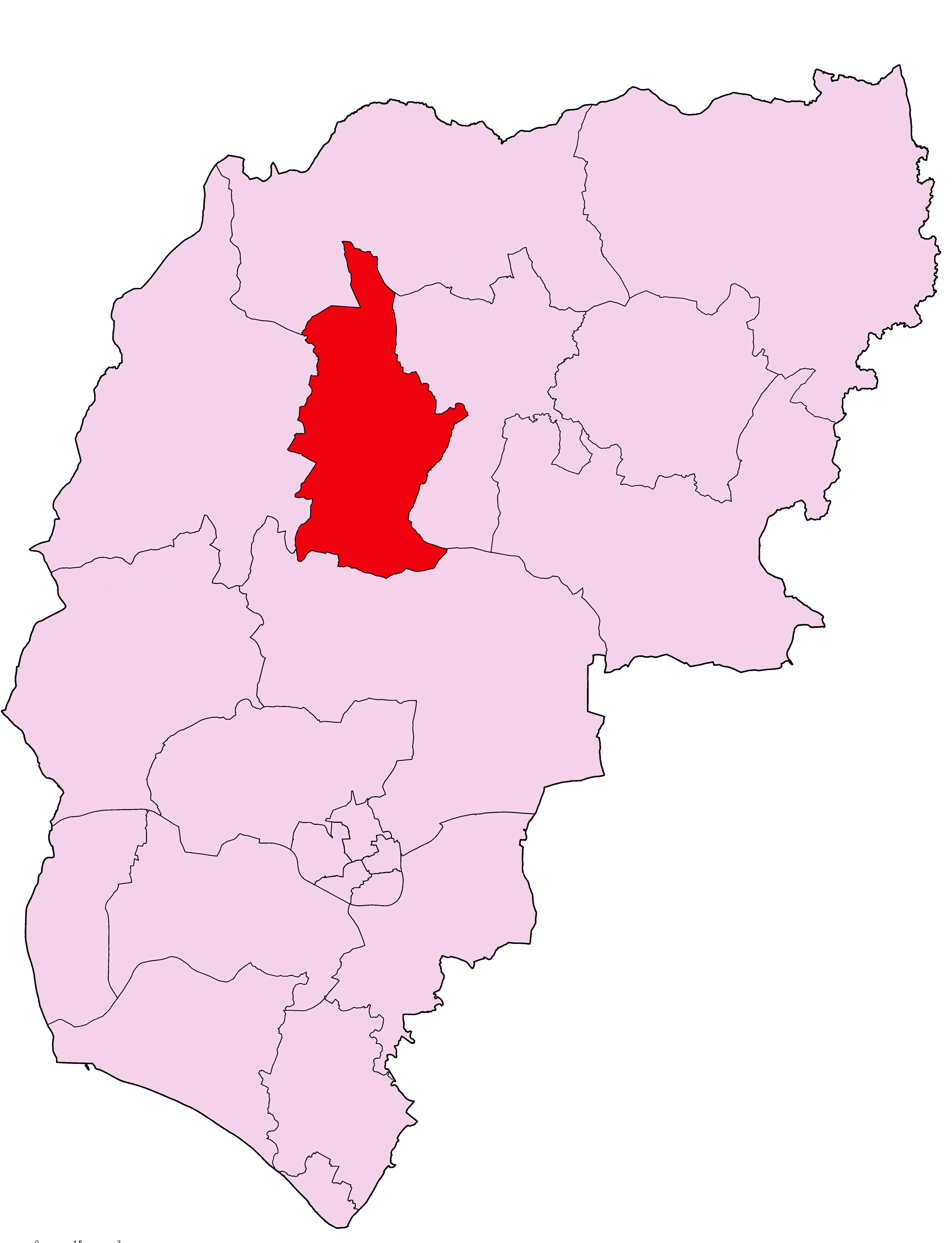
- Shown within Chichester
- Population: 5,621 (2019)
- District: Chichester
- Ceremonial county: West Sussex
- Country: England
- Sovereign state: United Kingdom
- UK Parliament: Chichester
- Councillors: Gordon McAra (I); Judith Fowler (LD)

Midhurst is an electoral ward of Chichester District, West Sussex, England and returns two members to sit on Chichester District Council.

Following a district boundary review, the former ward of Stedham was split and merged into Midhurst in 2019.

== Councillors ==
Year	Member	Party	Member	Party
2023	Hannah Burton	Liberal Democrat	Dominic Merritt	Liberal Democrat
2023	Hannah Burton	Liberal Democrat	Hannah Burton	Liberal Democrat

== Election results ==
Chichester District Council Election 2019: Midhurst
Party	Candidate	Votes	%	±%
Independent	Gordon Valentine McAra	1,280	34.5	
Liberal Democrats	Judith Russell Fowler	666	18.0	
Conservative	Sally Veronica Watts	636	17.1	
Conservative	Nicholas Richard Donald Thomas	553	14.9	
Liberal Democrats	Caroline Lynda Annette Neville	335	9.0	
Labour	Margaret Rhona Guest	227	6.1	
Turnout		3,707	38.21	
Independent hold		Swing		
Liberal Democrats gain from Independent		Swing		

Midhurst Election of District Councillors 7 May 2015:
Party	Candidate	Votes	%	±%
Independent	Gordon Valentine McAra	1377		
Independent	Stephen (Steve) Frank Morley	1148		
Conservative	Danielle Margaret Dunfield	1105		
Liberal Democrats	Judith Russell Fowler	460		
Labour	Margaret Rhona Guest	377		
Turnout		2660	67.58	
Majority				
Independent hold		Swing		
