= Chichester District =

Local government district in West Sussex, England

Coordinates: 50.837°N 0.780°W

- Non-metropolitan district
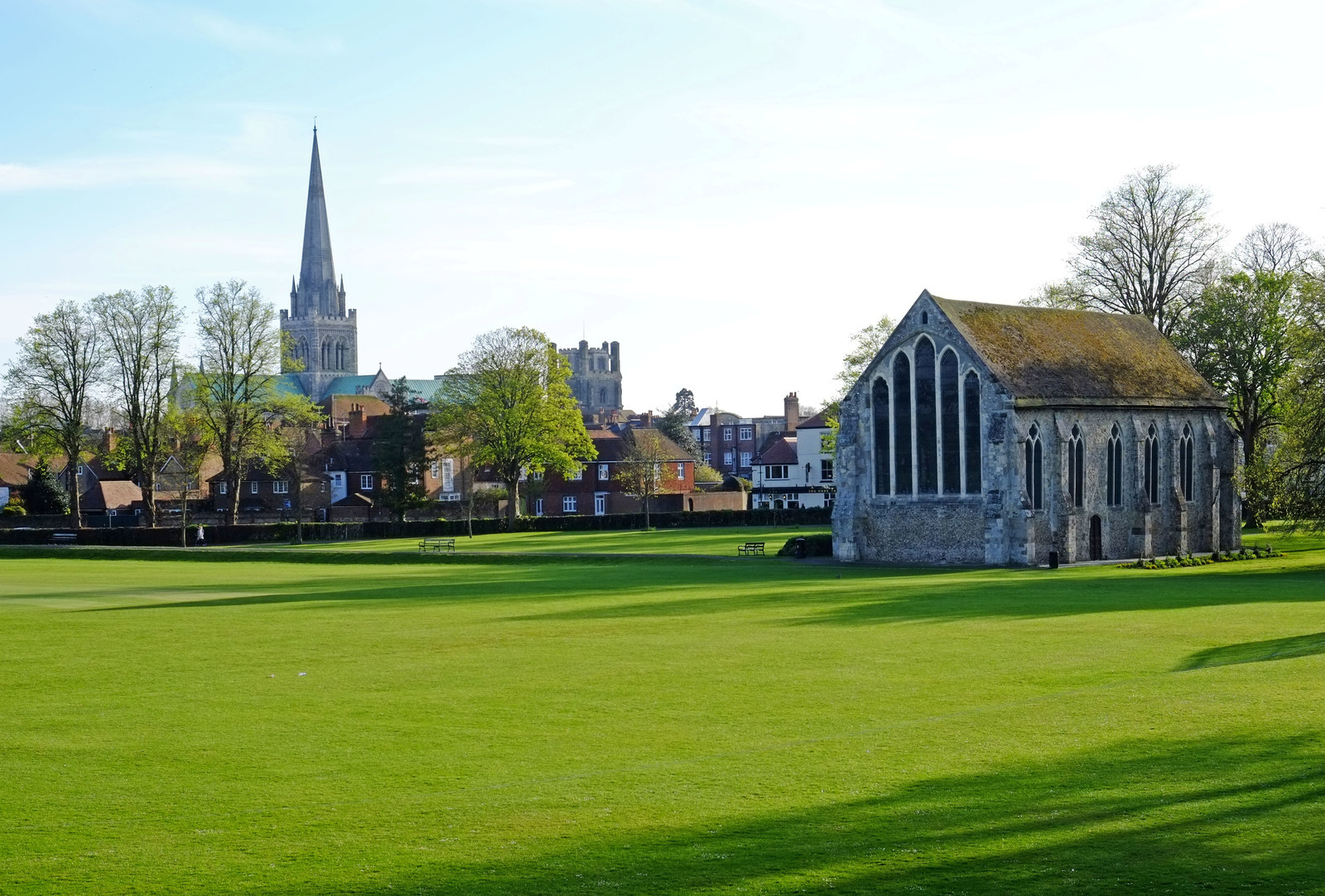
- Chichester Cathedral and Guildhall

- Chichester shown within West Sussex
- Sovereign state: United Kingdom
- Constituent country: England
- Region: South East England
- Non-metropolitan county: West Sussex
- Status: Non-metropolitan district
- Admin HQ: Chichester
- Incorporated: 1 April 1974

Government
  - Type: Non-metropolitan district council
  - Body: Chichester District Council
  - MPs: Jess Brown-Fuller (LD); Andrew Griffith (C)

Area
  - Total: 303.60 sq mi (786.32 km^{2})
  - Rank: 42nd (of 296)

Population (2025)
  - Total: 130,224
  - Rank: 190th (of 296)
  - Density: 428.93/sq mi (165.61/km^{2})

Ethnicity (2021)
  - Ethnic groups: List: 95.4% White; 1.7% Asian; 1.6% Mixed; 0.6% Black; 0.5% other

Religion (2021)
  - Religion: List: 53.1% Christianity; 38.7% no religion; 6.2% not stated; 0.6% Islam; 0.5% other; 0.5% Buddhism; 0.3% Hinduism; 0.2% Judaism; 0.1% Sikhism
- Time zone: UTC0 (GMT)
  - Summer (DST): UTC+1 (BST)

Chichester is a local government district in West Sussex, England. It is named after the city of Chichester, which is its largest settlement and where the council is based. The district includes the towns of Midhurst, Petworth and Selsey and surrounding rural areas, including many villages. The district includes part of the South Downs National Park, and Chichester Harbour is a designated Area of Outstanding Natural Beauty. At the 2021 census the district had a population of 124,531.

The district is on the coast, facing the English Channel. The neighbouring districts are Arun, Horsham, Waverley, East Hampshire and Havant.

== History ==
Chichester itself had been an ancient borough, which additionally held city status from 1075 when the Diocese of Chichester moved its seat from Selsey to Chichester.

The modern district was formed on 1 April 1974 under the Local Government Act 1972 as one of seven districts within West Sussex. The new district covered the whole area of three former districts and parts of a fourth, which were all abolished at the same time:

- Chichester Municipal Borough (city)
- Chichester Rural District (except 13 parishes which went to Arun)
- Midhurst Rural District
- Petworth Rural District

The new district was named Chichester, after its largest settlement. The medieval territory of the Rape of Chichester had also covered much of the area of the new district. A successor parish was established covering the former borough of Chichester, and Chichester's city status passed to the new parish rather than the wider district. As such, Chichester City Council is a parish council, whilst Chichester District Council has greater powers and covers the much larger area of Chichester District.

== Governance ==
Chichester District Council

Type
- Type: Non-metropolitan district

History
- Founded: 1 April 1974

Leadership
- Chair: Clare Apel, Liberal Democrat since 17 May 2023
- Leader: Adrian Moss, Liberal Democrat since 17 May 2023
- Chief Executive: Diane Shepherd since 2012

Structure
- Seats: 36 councillors
- Political groups: Administration (24) Liberal Democrats (24) Other parties (12) Conservative (5) Local Alliance (4) Green (1) Independent (2)
- Length of term: 4 years

Elections
- Voting system: First-past-the-post
- Last election: 4 May 2023
- Next election: 6 May 2027

Meeting place
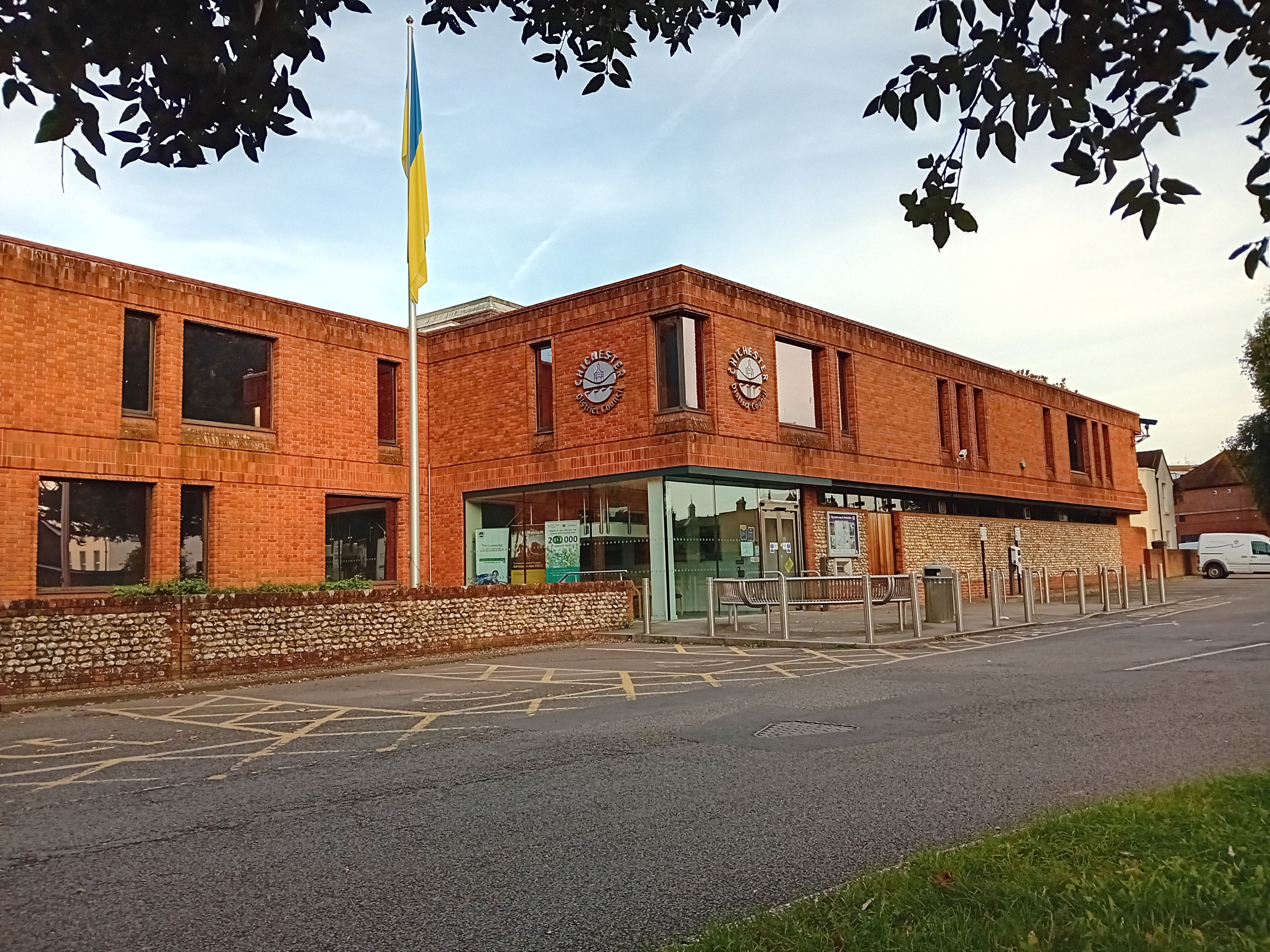
- East Pallant House, 1 East Pallant, Chichester, PO19 1TY

Website
- www.chichester.gov.uk

Chichester District Council provides district-level services. County-level services are provided by West Sussex County Council. The whole district is also covered by civil parishes, which form a third tier of local government.

In the parts of the district within the South Downs National Park, town planning is the responsibility of the South Downs National Park Authority. The district council appoints one of its councillors to serve on the 27-person National Park Authority.

=== Political control ===
The council has been under Liberal Democrat majority control since the 2023 election.

The first elections to the council were held in 1973, initially operating as a shadow authority alongside the outgoing authorities until the new arrangements came into effect on 1 April 1974. Political control of the council since 1974 has been as follows:

Party in control	Years
No overall control	1974–1976
Conservative	1976–1995
No overall control	1995–1999
Conservative	1999–2004
No overall control	2004–2006
Conservative	2006–2019
No overall control	2019–2019
Conservative	2019–2020
No overall control	2020–2023
Liberal Democrats	2023–present

=== Leadership ===
The leaders of the council since 1999 have been:

Councillor	Party	From	To
Jane Chevis	Conservative	1999	May 2003
Janet Duncton	Conservative	2003	2005
Andrew Smith	Liberal Democrats	2005	2006
Myles Cullen	Conservative	2006	2011
Heather Caird	Conservative	17 May 2011	May 2015
Tony Dignum	Conservative	19 May 2015	May 2019
Eileen Lintill	Conservative	21 May 2019	May 2023
Adrian Moss	Liberal Democrats	17 May 2023	

=== Composition ===
Following the 2023 election, by-elections, and resignations up to September 2026, the composition of the council was:

Party	Councillors
Liberal Democrats	24
Conservative	5
Local Alliance	4
Independent	2
Green	1
Total	36

The Local Alliance, Independents, and sole Green councillor sit together as the Green and Local Alliance Group, which forms the council's largest opposition group. The next election is due in 2027.

=== Elections ===
Since the last boundary changes in 2019 the council has comprised 36 councillors representing 21 wards, with each ward electing one, two or three councillors. Elections are held every four years.

==== Councillors and wards ====
List of Chichester district councillors by ward:

Ward	Councillor	Elected	Notes
Chichester West	Clare Apel	1999	Member of Chichester City Council
The Witterings	Iain Ballantyne	2023	
Southbourne	Tracie Bangert	2019	Member of West Sussex County Council
Harbour Villages	Richard Bates	2023	Member of West Sussex County Council
North Mundham and Tangmere	David Betts	2023	Vice-Chair of Council
Selsey South	Steve Boulcott	2023	
Chichester East	Bill Brisbane	2021	Cabinet Member for Planning; Elected following a by-election held in June 2021
Westbourne	Roy Briscoe	2019	
Lavant	Joseph Brookes-Harmer	2023	Resigned from the Liberal Democrats and sits as an independent, as of April 2026.
Chichester North	Jonathan Brown	2023	Deputy Leader of the Council and Cabinet Member for Environmental Strategy; Previously represented Southbourne (2015–2023)
Midhurst	Dominic Merritt	2025	Elected in a by-election in May 2025.
Fernhurst	Brett Elise Burkhart	2023	
Midhurst	Hannah Burton	2023	
Chichester East	Rhys Chant	2023	Cabinet Member for Communities and Wellbeing, Member of Chichester City Council
The Witterings	Mark Chilton	2023	Cabinet Member for Finance, Corporate Services and Chichester Contract Services
Chichester North	Maureen Corfield	2023	Member of Chichester City Council
Fittleworth	John Cross	2023	
Petworth	Harsha Desai	2023	Cabinet Member for Growth and Place
Loxwood	Gareth Evans	2019	
The Witterings	Elizabeth Hamilton	2019	Previously represented Easebourne (2007–2015) and West Wittering (2015–2019)
North Mundham and Tangmere	Charlie Hastain	2023	
Southbourne	Oona Hickson	2023	Cabinet Member for Housing, Revenues and Benefits
Easebourne	Francis Hobbs	2015	
Sidlesham with Selsey North	Donna Johnson	2019	Chair of West Sussex County Council, Member of West Sussex County Council
Harbour Villages	Stephen Johnson	2023	
Selsey South	Timothy Johnson	2019	
Harbour Villages	Adrian Moss	2019	Leader of the Council; Previously represented Fishbourne (2003–2011; 2018–2019)
Fernhurst	Eleanora Newbery	2023	
Harting	Tim O'Kelly	2023	
Goodwood	Henry Potter	2019	Previously represented Boxgrove (2007–2019)
Chichester West	Sarah Quail	2023	Member of Chichester City Council
Chichester South	Sarah Sharp	2019	Member of West Sussex County Council
Loxwood	Charles Todhunter	2023	
Chichester Central	James Vivian	2023	Member of Chichester City Council
Sidlesham with Selsey North	Val Weller	2023	
Chichester South	Tim Young	2023	

=== Premises ===
The council is based at East Pallant House, on East Pallant in the centre of Chichester. The oldest part of the building was originally a large house, which had subsequently served as the headquarters of the old Chichester Rural District Council prior to the 1974 reorganisation. Large modern extensions have since been added to the building.

== Geography ==
Chichester District occupies the western part of West Sussex, bordering on Hampshire to the west and Surrey to the north. The districts of Arun and Horsham abut to the east; the English Channel to the south. The district is divided by the South Downs escarpment, with the northern part being in the Weald, composed of a mixture of sandstone ridges and low-lying clays known as the Western Weald. To the south the dip slope of the downs falls gently to a flat coastal plain and the sea. The Western Weald is drained by the River Arun and its tributaries including the rivers Lox, Kird and especially the River Rother and its tributaries the River Lod and the Haslingbourne Stream. On the northern boundary Blackdown is the highest point in Sussex, while further east around Loxwood the land is low and quite flat. The south of the district has many permeable chalk and gravel areas and is drained by two winterbournes, the River Lavant and River Ems, which are usually dry in the summer. The large inlet known as Chichester Harbour and the headland of Selsey Bill are conspicuous features of the coast.

The district, apart from the few main roads, is generally rural in character, as can be seen by the number of villages within it. Apart from the coastal strip there are few main roads, and the erstwhile railways which once served Midhurst have long been closed.

== Civil parishes ==
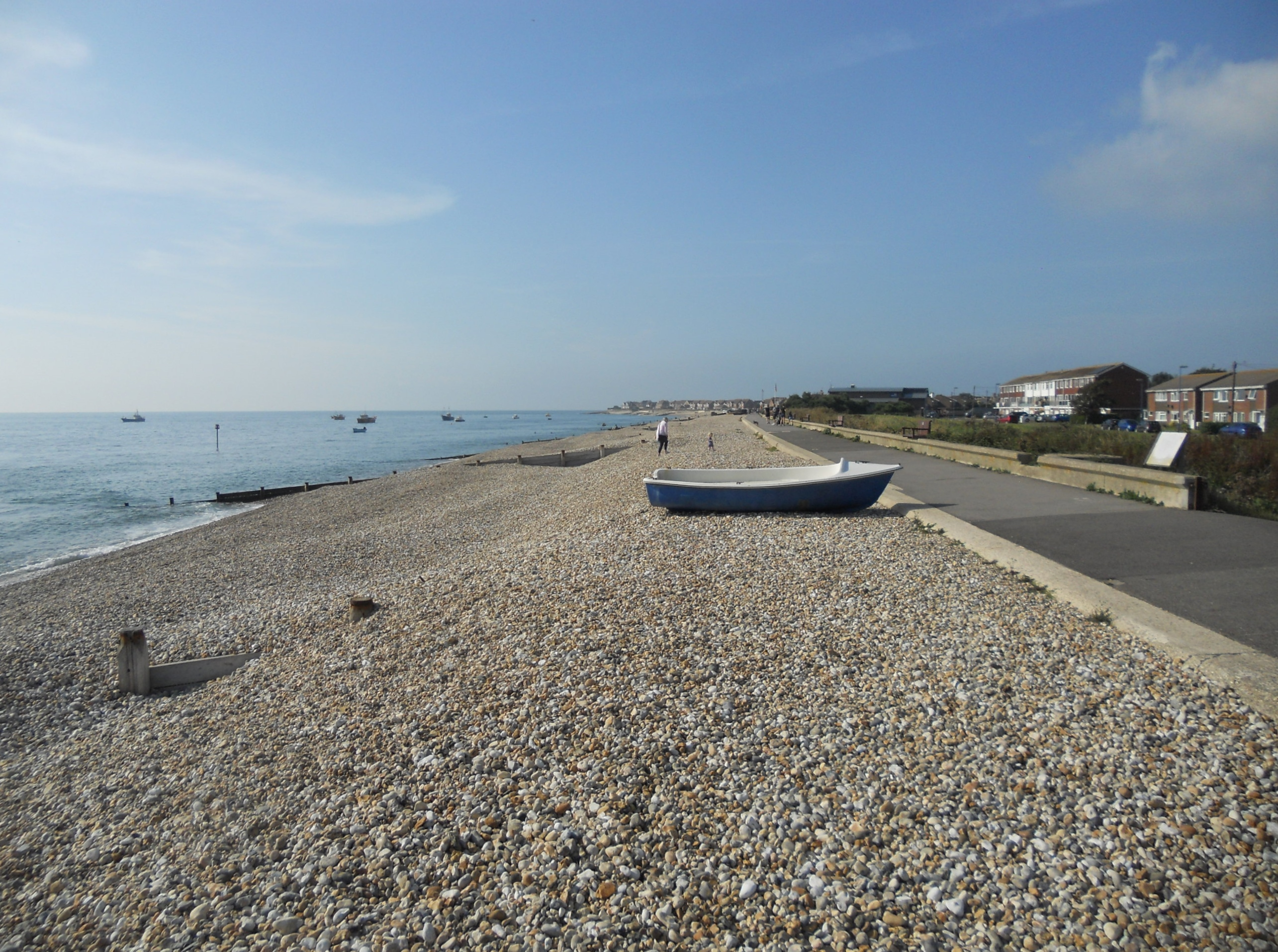
Beach at Selsey, the district's second largest settlement

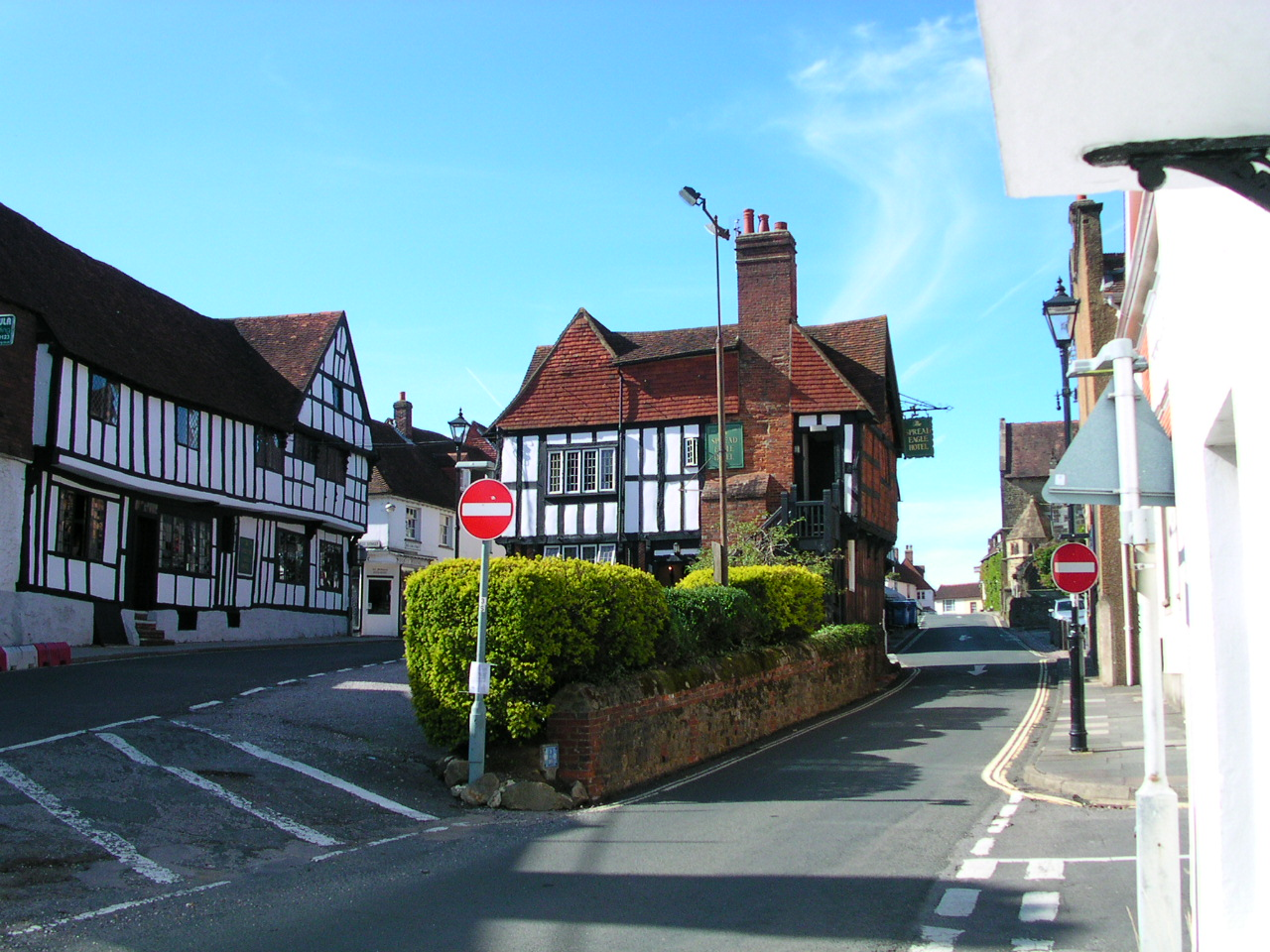
South Street, Midhurst

There are 67 civil parishes in Chichester District. The parish of Chichester holds city status, allowing the parish council to call itself a city council. The parish councils for Midhurst, Petworth and Selsey have each declared their parishes to be towns, allowing them to take the style "town council". Some of the smaller parishes have a parish meeting rather than a parish council.

== Landmarks ==
Apart from the geographical landmarks Chichester District contains architectural and cultural places including Chichester Cathedral, Chichester Festival Theatre, The Novium and Pallant House Gallery in the city. Stately homes open to the public include Petworth House and Uppark, both National Trust properties, Goodwood House and Stansted Park. West Dean College is open at certain times of the year. There is horse racing at Goodwood Racecourse, the Goodwood Festival of Speed at Goodwood House, and the Goodwood Revival at Goodwood Motor Racing Circuit. Cowdray House is a ruined Tudor mansion near Midhurst. Fishbourne Roman Palace lies west of Chichester city centre. To the north of the city are Weald and Downland Open Air Museum and Halnaker Windmill. There are gardens open to the public at Woolbeding and Pound Commons and West Dean College.

== Economy ==
West Sussex County Council and Chichester District Council are major employers in Chichester, along with Rolls-Royce Motor Cars assembly plant at nearby Westhampnett. Boatbuilding is an important industry along the coast. Many people from the northern parts of the district commute to work in London, using the A3 road or the railways from Portsmouth to London Waterloo station and Littlehampton to London Victoria station. Fertile soils on the coastal plain are used for arable farming and intensive vegetable production, the latter employing many migrant workers from Eastern Europe. High sunlight levels and a mild climate also make the coastal region suitable for glasshouse growing. A fertile strip of land on the north side of the River Rother is also used for vegetable growing, but most of the area north of the Downs is of low agricultural value and there are large areas of forest and pasture, interspersed with arable cropping.

== Football clubs ==
- Bosham F.C.
- Chichester City F.C.
- Midhurst & Easebourne F.C.
- Selsey F.C.
