= Fishburn (disambiguation) =

Fishburn is a village and civil parish in County Durham, England.

Fishburn may also refer to:

== People ==
- Dudley Fishburn (born 1946), business man with strong links to the not-for-profit world
- M. S. Fishburn (1844–1926), American politician
- Peter C. Fishburn (1936–2021), pioneer in the field of decision-making processes
- Sam Fishburn (1893–1965), American Major League Baseball player

== Other ==
- Fishburn Airfield, a small grass strip airfield in Fishburn, County Durham
- Fishburn Grassland, a Site of Special Scientific Interest in the Sedgefield district of County Durham, England
- Fishburn (ship), one of several vessels of that name

== See also ==
- Fishburne (disambiguation)
- Fishbourne (disambiguation)
