= Fishbourne =

Fishbourne may refer to:

== Places ==
- Fishbourne, Isle of Wight, a village
- Fishbourne, West Sussex, a village
  - Fishbourne (UK electoral ward)
- Fishbourne Roman Palace, an archaeological site in West Sussex

== People ==
- William Fishbourn (1677–1742, also spelled Fishbourne), a mayor of Philadelphia

== See also ==
- Fishburn (disambiguation)
- Fishburne (disambiguation)
- Fishbourn (surname)
