= Chichester District Council elections =

Local government elections in West Sussex, England

Chichester District Council in West Sussex, England is elected every four years. Since the last boundary changes in 2019, 36 councillors have been elected from 21 wards.

== Council elections ==
- 1973 Chichester District Council election
- 1976 Chichester District Council election
- 1979 Chichester District Council election (New ward boundaries)
- 1983 Chichester District Council election
- 1987 Chichester District Council election (District boundary changes took place but the number of seats remained the same)
- 1991 Chichester District Council election
- 1995 Chichester District Council election (District boundary changes took place but the number of seats remained the same)
- 1999 Chichester District Council election
- 2003 Chichester District Council election (New ward boundaries reduced the number of seats by 2)
- 2007 Chichester District Council election
- 2011 Chichester District Council election
- 2015 Chichester District Council election
- 2019 Chichester District Council election (New ward boundaries reduced the number of seats by 12)
- 2023 Chichester District Council election

== Election results ==
Composition of the council
Year	Conservative	Liberal Democrats (Note: Includes totals for the predecessors of the Liberal Democrats, the Liberal Party and SDP (both of which participated in the Alliance).)	Labour	Green (Note: Includes totals for the predecessors of the Green Party of England and Wales, the Ecology Party and Green Party UK.)	Local Alliance	Independents & Others	Council control after election
Local government reorganisation; council established (50 seats)
1973	18	6	1	–	–	25	No overall control
1976	36	1	0	0	–	13	Conservative
New ward boundaries (50 seats)
1979	27	11	0	0	–	12	Conservative
1983	27	12	0	0	–	11	Conservative
1987	35	12	0	0	–	3	Conservative
1991	33	14	0	0	–	3	Conservative
1995	20	25	1	0	–	4	No overall control
1999	29	19	0	0	–	2	Conservative
New ward boundaries (48 seats)
2003	26	21	0	0	–	1	Conservative
2007	34	11	0	0	–	3	Conservative
2011	38	8	0	0	–	2	Conservative
2015	42	3	0	0	–	3	Conservative
New ward boundaries (36 seats)
2019	18	11	2	2	2	1	No overall control
2023	5	25	0	2	4	0	Liberal Democrats

== Results maps ==
2003 results map

2007 results map

2011 results map

2015 results map

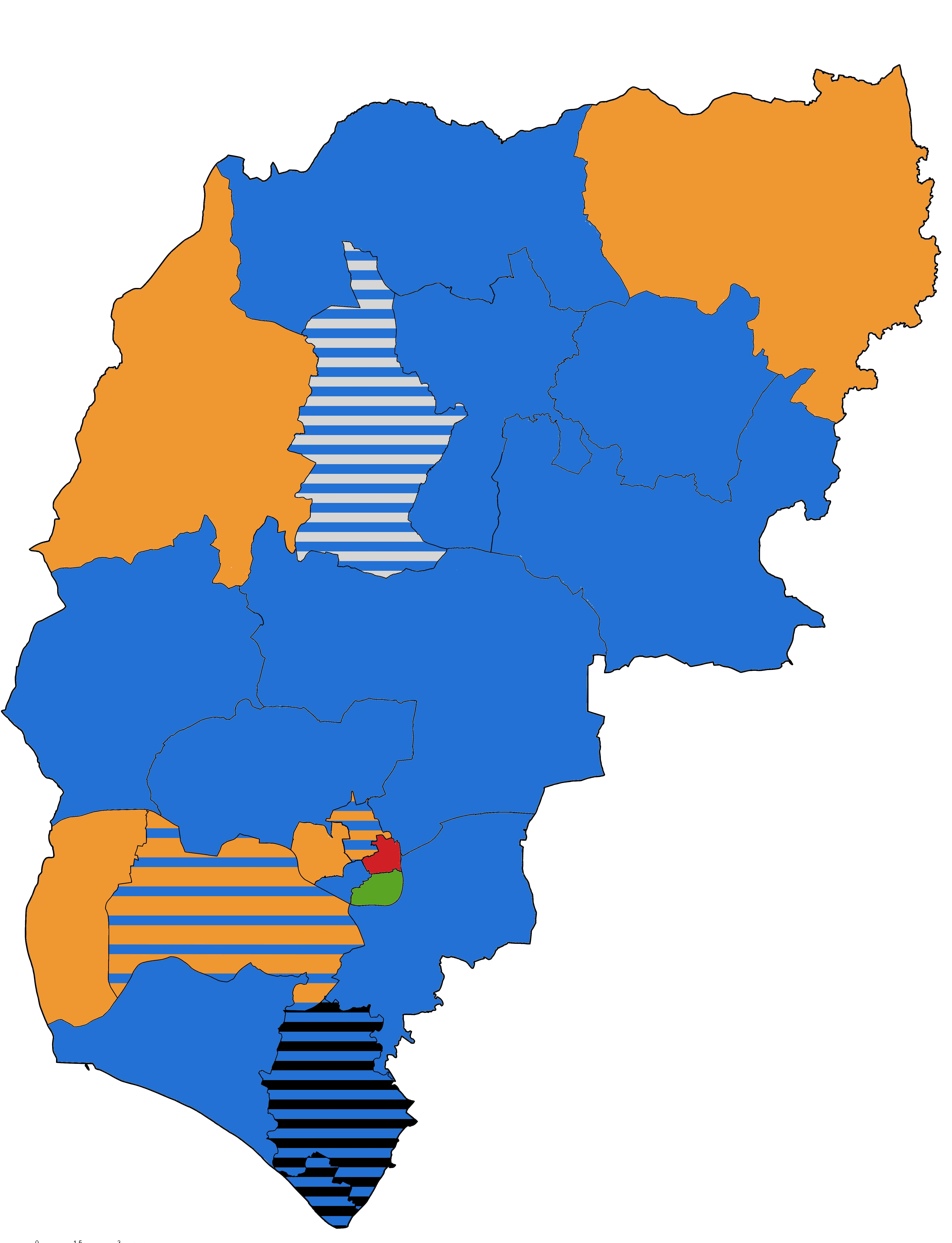
2019 results map

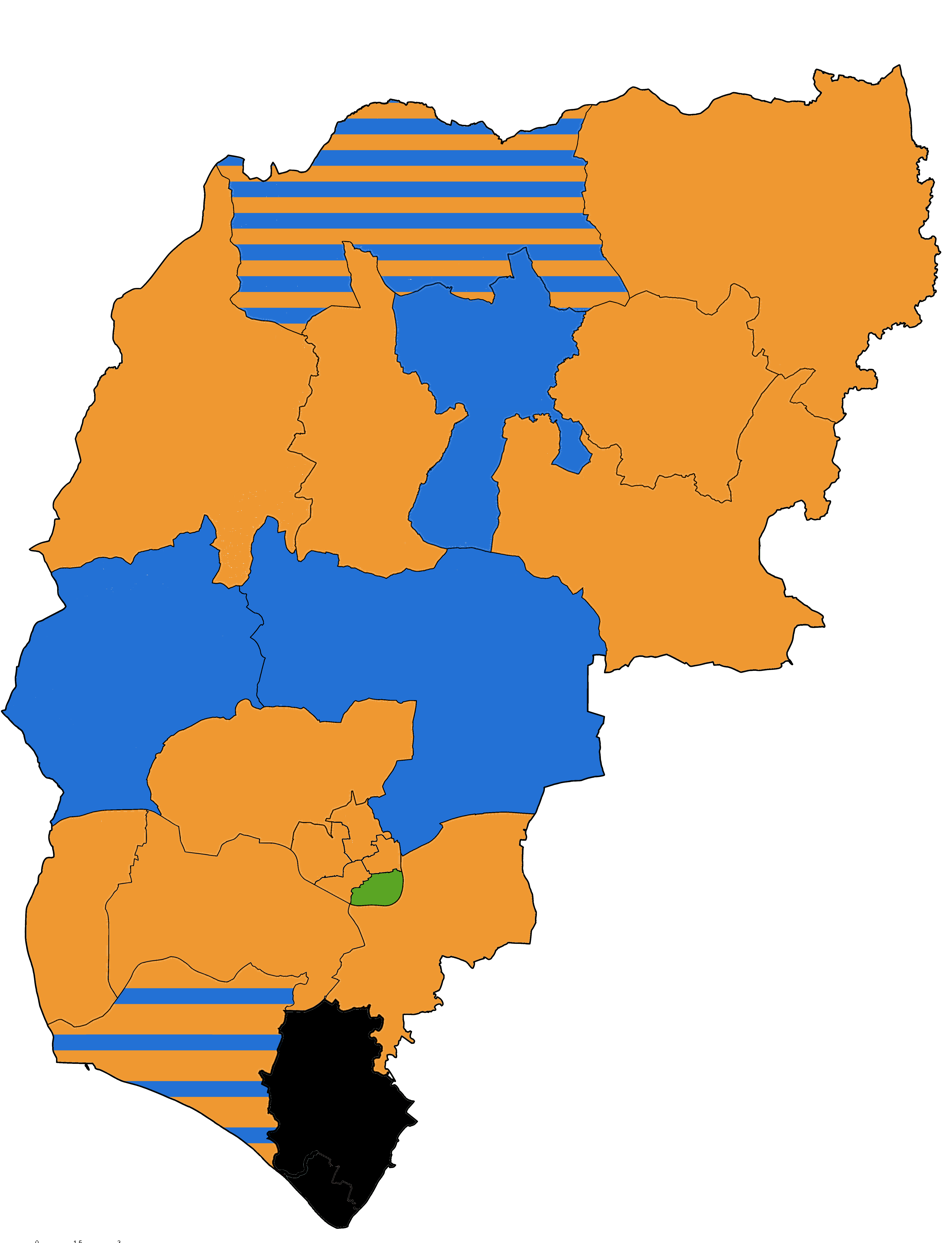
2023 results map

== By-election results ==
=== 1995–1999 ===
Petworth By-Election 11 December 1997
Party	Candidate	Votes	%	±%
Conservative		607	51.8	+7.5
Liberal Democrats		482	41.1	−14.6
Labour		65	5.5	+5.5
Independent		18	1.5	+1.5
Majority		125	10.7	
Turnout		1,172		
Conservative gain from Liberal Democrats		Swing		

Chichester East By-Election 7 May 1998
Party	Candidate	Votes	%	±%
Liberal Democrats		673	50.2	−2.0
Conservative		425	31.7	+7.8
Labour		242	18.1	−5.8
Majority		248	18.5	
Turnout		1,340		
Liberal Democrats hold		Swing		

Chichester South By-Election 7 May 1998
Party	Candidate	Votes	%	±%
Liberal Democrats		688	56.3	+0.4
Conservative		341	27.9	+5.2
Labour		193	15.8	−5.6
Majority		347	28.4	
Turnout		1,222		
Liberal Democrats hold		Swing		

=== 1999–2003 ===
Fernhurst By-Election 24 January 2002
Party	Candidate	Votes	%	±%
Liberal Democrats		595	66.0	+35.5
Conservative		249	27.6	−35.7
UKIP		57	6.3	+6.3
Majority		346	38.4	
Turnout		901	35.4	
Liberal Democrats gain from Conservative		Swing		

West Wittering By-Election 22 August 2002
Party	Candidate	Votes	%	±%
Conservative		418	51.7	−10.3
UKIP		186	23.0	+23.0
Liberal Democrats		159	19.7	−6.7
Labour		46	5.7	−5.9
Majority		232	28.7	
Turnout		809	32.9	
Conservative hold		Swing		

=== 2003–2007 ===
East Wittering By-Election 14 August 2003
Party	Candidate	Votes	%	±%
Independent	Keith Smith	427	35.8	+35.8
Liberal Democrats	Simon Green	421	35.3	+2.7
Conservative	Jane Chevis	231	19.4	−15.8
UKIP	Roger Wilson	69	5.8	−4.2
Labour	Patrick O'Sullivan	45	3.8	−11.1
Majority		6	0.5	
Turnout		1,193	33.6	
Independent gain from Liberal Democrats		Swing		

Plaistow By-Election 14 August 2003
Party	Candidate	Votes	%	±%
Conservative	Paul Mackey	471	52.6	−10.4
Liberal Democrats	Raymond Cooper	363	40.5	+3.5
UKIP	Vivienne Moran	62	6.9	+6.9
Majority		108	12.1	
Turnout		896	24.2	
Conservative hold		Swing		

Selsey North By-Election 30 September 2004
Party	Candidate	Votes	%	±%
Liberal Democrats	Jacqueline Cook	485	35.3	+35.3
Conservative	Nicholas Bromfield	414	30.1	−18.0
UKIP	Bernard Smith	328	23.9	+3.7
Labour	Ian Bell	147	10.7	−21.0
Majority		71	5.2	
Turnout		1,374	28.5	
Liberal Democrats gain from Conservative		Swing		

Chichester East By-Election 16 June 2005
Party	Candidate	Votes	%	±%
Liberal Democrats	Michael Denmead	611	62.1	+20.9
Conservative	Stuart King	262	26.6	+7.4
UKIP	James McCulloch	58	6.0	−9.6
BNP	Andrew Emerson	52	5.3	+5.3
Majority		349	35.5	
Turnout		983	17.4	
Liberal Democrats hold		Swing		

Tangmere By-Election 18 May 2006
Party	Candidate	Votes	%	±%
Conservative	Brenda Esther Atlee	278	44.1	+2.9
Liberal Democrats	Betty Rudkin	275	43.7	−8.4
BNP	Andrew Emerson	41	6.5	+6.5
UKIP	James McCulloch	22	3.5	+3.5
Labour	Patrick Joseph O'Sullivan	14	2.2	−4.5
Majority		3	0.4	
Turnout		630	36.0	
Conservative gain from Liberal Democrats		Swing		

West Wittering By-Election 20 July 2006
Party	Candidate	Votes	%	±%
Conservative	Justus Adriaan Pieter Montyn	868	57.5	+5.6
Independent	David Hopson	330	21.9	+21.9
Liberal Democrats	Roger Walter Tilbury	139	9.2	−9.9
BNP	Andrew Emerson	123	8.2	+8.2
Labour	Gordon Trevor Churchill	48	3.2	−2.7
Majority		538	35.6	
Turnout		1,508	37.5	
Conservative hold		Swing		

=== 2007–2011 ===
Bury By-Election 10 July 2008
Party	Candidate	Votes	%	±%
Conservative	John Francis Elliott	431	69.3	+14.0
Liberal Democrats	David Hares	191	30.7	+30.7
Majority		240	38.6	
Turnout		622	34.4	
Conservative hold		Swing		

East Wittering By-Election 23 October 2008
Party	Candidate	Votes	%	±%
Conservative	Graeme Barrett	410	40.3	+6.6
Liberal Democrats	Mary Ellen Green	364	35.8	+7.0
BNP	Andrew Emerson	125	12.3	+12.3
Labour	Patrick Joseph O'Sullivan	69	6.8	−0.4
UKIP	James McCulloch	49	4.8	+4.8
Majority		46	4.5	
Turnout		1,017	25.1	
Conservative hold		Swing		

Plaistow By-Election 5 February 2009
Party	Candidate	Votes	%	±%
Conservative	John Andrews	455	57.1	−21.0
Liberal Democrats	Raymond Ernest John Cooper	342	42.9	+21.0
Majority		113	14.2	
Turnout		797	21.3	
Conservative hold		Swing		

Plaistow By-Election 11 February 2010
Party	Candidate	Votes	%	±%
Conservative	Philippa Hardwick	504	57.7	−20.4
Liberal Democrats	Ray Cooper	301	34.4	+12.5
BNP	Andrew Emerson	69	7.9	+7.9
Majority		203	23.3	
Turnout		874	23.3	
Conservative hold		Swing		

=== 2011–2015 ===
Plaistow by-election, 19 April 2012
Party	Candidate	Votes	%	±%
Conservative	Nick Thomas	455	52.7	−8.3
Liberal Democrats	Ray Cooper	408	47.3	+20.6
Majority		47	5.4	
Turnout		863		
Conservative hold		Swing		

Westbourne by-election, 17 October 2013
Party	Candidate	Votes	%	±%
Conservative	Mark Dunn	184	41.3	−18.6
UKIP	Alicia Denny	106	23.8	+23.8
Green	Thomas French	85	19.1	+19.1
Liberal Democrats	Philip MacDougall	68	15.2	−24.9
Patria	Andrew Emerson	3	0.6	+0.6
Majority		78	17.5	
Turnout		446		
Conservative hold		Swing		

Rogate by-election, 23 October 2014
Party	Candidate	Votes	%	±%
Conservative	Gillian Keegan	342	71.3	−19.8
UKIP	Elena McCloskey	106	28.8	+28.8
Majority		204	42.5	
Turnout		480		
Conservative hold		Swing		

=== 2015–2019 ===
Plaistow by-election, 1 December 2016
Party	Candidate	Votes	%	±%
Liberal Democrats	Jonathan Brown	646	57.7	+15.8
Conservative	David Harwood	289	25.8	−32.3
UKIP	Patricia Hunt	132	11.8	+11.8
Labour	Rebecca Hamlet	53	4.7	+4.7
Majority		357	31.9	
Turnout		1,120		
Liberal Democrats gain from Conservative		Swing		

Bosham by-election, 4 May 2017
Party	Candidate	Votes	%	±%
Conservative	Andy Collins	859	57.0	−4.4
Liberal Democrats	Adrian Moss	649	43.0	+4.4
Majority		210	14.0	
Turnout		1,508		
Conservative hold		Swing		

East Wittering by-election, 4 May 2017
Party	Candidate	Votes	%	±%
Conservative	Keith Martin	965	72.6	+20.7
Labour	Joe O'Sullivan	177	13.3	−6.6
Liberal Democrats	Jane Scotland	169	12.7	+12.7
Patria	Andrew Emerson	18	1.4	+1.4
Majority		788	59.3	
Turnout		1,329		
Conservative hold		Swing		

North Mundham by-election, 4 May 2017
Party	Candidate	Votes	%	±%
Conservative	Chris Page	471	68.1	N/A
Liberal Democrats	Robert Linzell	221	31.9	N/A
Majority		250	36.2	
Turnout		692		
Conservative hold		Swing		

Plaistow by-election, 4 May 2017
Party	Candidate	Votes	%	±%
Conservative	Peter Wilding	1,042	73.6	−1.2
Liberal Democrats	Raymond Cooper	373	26.4	+1.2
Majority		669	47.2	
Turnout		1,415		
Conservative hold		Swing		

Fishbourne by-election, 22 February 2018
Party	Candidate	Votes	%	±%
Liberal Democrats	Adrian Moss	459	54.6	+3.3
Conservative	Libby Alexander	294	35.0	−2.2
Labour	Kevin Hughes	88	10.5	+10.5
Majority		165	19.6	
Turnout		841		
Liberal Democrats hold		Swing		

Rogate by-election, 12 April 2018
Party	Candidate	Votes	%	±%
Liberal Democrats	Kate O'Kelly	444	55.8	+55.8
Conservative	Robert Pettigrew	319	40.1	−27.3
Labour	Ray Davey	21	2.6	+2.6
Green	Philip Naber	12	1.5	−18.2
Majority		125	15.7	
Turnout		796		
Liberal Democrats gain from Conservative		Swing		

=== 2019–2023 ===
Loxwood by-election, 21 November 2019
Party	Candidate	Votes	%	±%
Conservative	Janet Duncton	1,005	61.8	+17.4
Liberal Democrats	Alexander Jeffery	486	29.9	−25.7
Green	Francesca Chetta	126	7.7	+7.7
Patria	Andrew Emerson	9	0.6	+0.6
Majority		519	31.9	
Turnout		1,626		
Conservative gain from Liberal Democrats		Swing		

Chichester East by-election, 24 June 2021
Party	Candidate	Votes	%	±%
Liberal Democrats	Bill Brisbane	430	43.0	+24.7
Conservative	Jane Kilby	310	31.0	+6.5
Labour	Clare Walsh	261	26.1	−3.7
Majority		120	12.0	
Turnout		1,001		
Liberal Democrats gain from Labour		Swing		

=== 2023–2027 ===
Midhurst by-election, 1 May 2025
Party	Candidate	Votes	%	±%
Liberal Democrats	Dominic Merritt	924	41.1	
Conservative	Danielle Dunfield-Prayero	712	31.7	
Reform	Adam Kirby	451	20.1	
Green	Philip Maber	105	4.7	
Labour	Juliette Reynolds	47	2.1	
Patria	Andrew Emerson	7	0.3	
Majority		212	9.4	
Turnout		2,246		
Liberal Democrats hold		Swing		
