= Andrew Mills =

Andrew Mills may refer to:

- Andrew Mills (Australian footballer) (born 1981), Australian rules footballer
- Andrew Mills (English footballer) (born 1994), English goalkeeper
- Andrew Harwood Mills (born 1980), English actor
- A. J. Mills (politician), member of the Washington House of Representatives
