= Fishbourne (ward) =

- Shown within Chichester
- Population: 1,781 (2007)
- District: Chichester
- Ceremonial county: West Sussex
- Country: England
- Sovereign state: United Kingdom
- UK Parliament: Chichester

Fishbourne was an electoral ward of Chichester District, West Sussex, England that returned one member to sit on Chichester District Council.

Following a district boundary review, it was merged into the new Harbour Villages ward in 2019.

== Councillor ==
| Election | Member | Party |
|---|---|---|
| 2003 | Adrian Moss | Lib Dem |
| 2007 | Adrian Moss | Lib Dem |
| 2011 | Simon Carr | Lib Dem |
| 2015 | Sandra Westacott | Lib Dem |
| 2018 | Adrian Moss | Lib Dem |

== Election results ==
Chichester District Council Election 2007: Fishbourne
| Party | Candidate | Votes | % | ±% |
|---|---|---|---|---|
| Liberal Democrats | Adrian Geoffrey Frank Moss | 674 | 73.0% | ▼0.1 |
| Conservative | Ann Myers | 249 | 27.0% | ▲0.1 |
| Majority | | 425 | 46.0% | |
| Turnout | | 923 | 51.9% | ▼0.6 |
| Liberal Democrats hold | | Swing | ▼0.1% | |

Chichester District Council Election 2011: Fishbourne
| Party | Candidate | Votes | % | ±% |
|---|---|---|---|---|
| Liberal Democrats | Simon Carr | 571 | 58.6% | ▼14.4 |
| Conservative | Paul Ruscoe | 403 | 41.4% | ▲14.4 |
| Majority | | 168 | 17.2% | ▼28.8 |
| Turnout | | 974 | 51.8% | ▼0.1 |
| Liberal Democrats hold | | Swing | ▼14.4 | |

Chichester District Council Election 2015: Fishbourne
| Party | Candidate | Votes | % | ±% |
|---|---|---|---|---|
| Liberal Democrats | Sandra Westacott | 719 | 50.9% | ▼7.7 |
| Conservative | Nigel Hogben | 522 | 36.9% | ▼4.5 |
| Green | Pauline Gaskin | 161 | 11.4% | ▲11.4 |
| Majority | | 197 | 14.0% | ▼3.9 |
| Turnout | | 1,413 | 72.8% | ▲21.0 |
| Liberal Democrats hold | | Swing | ▼6.1 | |

Fishbourne by-election 22 February 2018
| Party | Candidate | Votes | % | ±% |
|---|---|---|---|---|
| Liberal Democrats | Adrian Moss | 459 | 54.6% | ▲3.3 |
| Conservative | Elizabeth Alexander | 293 | 35.0% | ▼2.3 |
| Labour | Kevin Hughes | 88 | 10.5% | n/a |
| Majority | | 166 | 19.6% | ▲5.6 |
| Turnout | | 840 | 44.4 | ▼28.4 |
| Liberal Democrats hold | | Swing | ▲2.8 | |
