= List of shipwrecks in January 1847 =

The list of shipwrecks in January 1847 includes ships sunk, foundered, wrecked, grounded, or otherwise lost during January 1847.

== 1 January ==
List of shipwrecks: 1 January 1847
Ship	State	Description
Champlain	(United Kingdom of Great Britain and Ireland) British North America	The barque was driven ashore at Black Point, Nova Scotia. Her crew were rescued. She was on a voyage from Saint John's, Newfoundland to Milford, United States.
Elizabeth	United Kingdom	The brig ran aground on the Scroby Sands, Norfolk. She was on a voyage from Sunderland, County Durham to London. She was refloated on 3 January and taken in to Great Yarmouth, Norfolk.
Heroine	(United Kingdom of Great Britain and Ireland) Guernsey	The ship was wrecked 7 leagues (21 nautical miles (39 km) south of the Rio Grande. Her crew were rescued. She was on a voyage from Rio de Janeiro, Brazil to the Rio Grande.
Leonidas	Greece	The brig sprang a leak and was beached at "Gillyswick", Pembrokeshire, United Kingdom. She was refloated the next day.

== 2 January ==
List of shipwrecks: 2 January 1847
Ship	State	Description
Activity	United Kingdom	The brig ran aground and sank in the Pakefield Gat, off the coast of Suffolk. Her crew survived.
Euphan	United Kingdom	The ship ran aground on the Stranton Sands, off the coast of County Durham.
Frederick Wilhelm IV	Denmark	The ship ran aground on the Droogden, in the North Sea. She was refloated and put in to Copenhagen for repairs.
Harbinger	United Kingdom	The ship was wrecked on the Stranton Sands.
Junge Wilhelm	Hamburg	The ship ran aground and sank at Cuxhaven. She was refloated.
Levisham	United Kingdom	The ship struck the Whitby Ridge and sank. Her crew were rescued.
Prince George	United Kingdom	The ship was driven ashore and severely damaged at Dundalk, County Louth. Her crew were rescued.
Thetford	United Kingdom	The ship was driven ashore and wrecked at Scarborough Castle, Yorkshire. Her crew were rescued. She was on a voyage from Scarborough to Whitby.
William Glen Anderson	United Kingdom	The ship ran aground off Paspébiac, Province of Canada, British North America and was severely damaged. She was on a voyage from Restigouche, Nova Scotia, British North America to an English port. She was consequently condemned.

== 3 January ==
List of shipwrecks: 3 January 1847
Ship	State	Description
Betsy	United Kingdom	The ship was driven ashore and wrecked near Killybegs, County Donegal. Her crew were rescued. She was on a voyage from Liverpool, Lancashire to Sligo.
Cato	United Kingdom	The ship ran aground and sank at Torquay, Devon. She was on a voyage from Middlesbrough, Yorkshire to Torquay.
Inconstant	(United Kingdom of Great Britain and Ireland) British North America	The barque departed from Halifax, Nova Scotia for Liverpool. No further trace, presumed foundered with the loss of all hands.
Stella	United Kingdom	The ship ran aground on the Middle Sand, in the North Sea off the coast of Lincolnshire and sank.

== 4 January ==
List of shipwrecks: 4 January 1847
Ship	State	Description
Australian	United Kingdom	The ship was driven ashore and wrecked near Canea, Crete. She was on a voyage from Kertch, Russia to Hull, Yorkshire.
Baltic	United Kingdom	The ship was driven ashore at King's Lynn, Norfolk. She was refloated on 6 January and taken in to King's Lynn.
Beaton	United Kingdom	The ship was driven ashore at King's Lynn. She was refloated on 6 January and taken in to King's Lynn.
Catherine	United Kingdom	The ship was driven ashore and wrecked at Llanelly, Glamorgan. Her crew were rescued. She was on a voyage from Newport, Monmouthshire to Ayr.
Flora	United Kingdom	The ship was driven ashore at King's Lynn. She was refloated on 6 January and taken in to King's Lynn.
Jane	United Kingdom	The ship was driven ashore at Isleornsay, Skye, Outer Hebrides. She was on a voyage from Newport, Monmouthshire to Leith, Lothian. She was refloated the next day.
Norval	United Kingdom	The ship was driven ashore at King's Lynn. She was refloated on 6 January and taken in to King's Lynn.
Plutus	United Kingdom	The ship departed from Saint John, New Brunswick, British North America for Liverpool, Lancashire. No further trace, presumed foundered with the loss of all hands.
Pomona	United Kingdom	The ship was driven ashore at King's Lynn. She was refloated on 6 January and taken in to King's Lynn.

== 5 January ==
List of shipwrecks: 5 January 1847
Ship	State	Description
Armin	United Kingdom	The ship ran aground on the Langlutjensand, in the North Sea. She was on a voyage from Hull, Yorkshire to Bremen.
Catherine	United Kingdom	The ship was driven ashore near the mouth of the River Gwendraeth. Her crew were rescued. She was on a voyage from Newport, Monmouthshire to Ayr. Catherine was refloated the next day.
HMS Daphne	Royal Navy	The Daphne-class corvette ran aground on the Horse Bank, in the Solent. She was refloated with assistance from HMS Echo (Royal Navy) and put back to Spithead, Hampshire.
Little Aggie	United Kingdom	The ship was in collision with the steamship Town of Drogheda (United Kingdom) and sank at Greenock, Renfrewshire.
Ocean	United Kingdom	The brig was driven ashore between Cleethorpes and Grimsby, Lincolnshire.
St. Clement	United Kingdom	The ship was driven ashore near "Williamstadt", Zeeland, Netherlands. She was refloated but consequently sank. Her crew were rescued. She was on a voyage from Liverpool, Lancashire to Dordrecht, South Holland, Netherlands.
Stella	United Kingdom	The brig sank in the North Sea off Grimsby. She was refloated and taken in to Grimsby.

== 6 January ==
List of shipwrecks: 6 January 1847
Ship	State	Description
Alexandra	Russia	The ship was wrecked at Constantinople, Ottoman Empire.
Amalia	Russia	The ship was wrecked at Constantinople.
Emerald	United Kingdom	The ship was struck a rock and wrecked in Broadhaven Bay. Her crew were rescued. She was on a voyage from Liverpool, Lancashire to Westport, County Mayo.
Lady Ann	United Kingdom	The ship ran aground on the Whitton Sand, in the North Sea. She was on a voyage from Goole, Yorkshire to King's Lynn, Norfolk. She was refloated and put in to Grimsby, Lincolnshire in a leaky condition.
Panthea	United Kingdom	The ship departed from New York, United States for Liverpool, Lancashire. No further trace, presumed foundered with the loss of all hands.
Providence	United Kingdom	The smack sprang a leak and was beached at Point of Ayre, Isle of Man, where she was wrecked. She was on a voyage from Workington, Cumberland to Ardglass, County Down.
Sophia	Russia	The ship was wrecked at Constantinople.

== 7 January ==
List of shipwrecks: 7 January 1847
Ship	State	Description
George Marsden	United Kingdom	The ship ran aground on the Goodwin Sands, Kent. She was on a voyage from St. Stephen, New Brunswick, British North America to Hull, Yorkshire. She was refloated and taken in to The Downs.
Newcastle	United Kingdom	The ship was driven ashore between Callanafersy and Lack, County Kerry. She was on a voyage from Tralee, County Kerry to Liverpool, Lancashire.
Peri	United Kingdom	The ship ran aground at Inch, County Cork and was damaged. She was on a voyage from Cork to Killorglin, County Kerry. She was refloated the next day and taken in to Lack for repairs.

== 8 January ==
List of shipwrecks: 9 January 1847
Ship	State	Description
Estafette	Russia	The ship was driven ashore at South Foreland, Kent, United Kingdom. She was on a voyage from Messina, Sicily to Reval. She was refloated and taken in to Dover, Kent.
Jane	United Kingdom	The ship was driven ashore at Blockhouse Point, Hampshire. She was on a voyage from Portsmouth, Hampshire to Sunderland, County Durham.
Jane	United Kingdom	The ship was driven ashore in the Turks Islands. Her crew were rescued. She was on a voyage from Arichat, Nova Scotia, British North America to Havana, Cuba.
Rob Roy	United Kingdom	The ship was driven ashore and wrecked at Kirkcudbright, Wigtownshire. She was refloated on 17 January and beached at Kirkcudbright.
Sharp	United Kingdom	The barque ran aground at North Shields, County Durham. She was on a voyage from South Shields to the West Indies and/or the Cape of Good Hope. She was refloated on 11 January.

== 9 January ==
List of shipwrecks: 9 January 1847
Ship	State	Description
Aim	United Kingdom	The ship struck the Arklow Bank, in the Irish Sea off the coast of County Wicklow and was damaged. She was on a voyage from Liverpool, Lancashire to Virginia, United States. She consequently put in to Holyhead, Anglesey.
Catharia	Hamburg	The barque ran aground in the Elbe. She was on a voyage from South Shields, County Durham, United Kingdom to Hamburg. She was refloated with assistance from the steamship, Elbe (Hamburg) and taken in to Cuxhaven.
Culzean Castle	United Kingdom	The ship was driven ashore on Lady Isle, Ayrshire. She was on a voyage from Troon, Ayrshire to Malta.
Druid	United Kingdom	The ship was driven ashore and wrecked at Kirkcudbright, Wigtownshire. She was refloated on 17 January.
Forager	United Kingdom	The ship was driven ashore at Economy, Nova Scotia, British North America. She was on a voyage Hull, Yorkshire to Saint John, New Brunswick, British North America.
Loyal William	United Kingdom	The ship was driven ashore and wrecked near Vila Real de Santo António, Spain. Her crew were rescued. She was on a voyage from Liverpool to Cádiz, Spain.
Sir Robert Peel	United Kingdom	The ship was driven ashore at Cutler, Maine, United States. She floated off but consequently foundered. Her crew were rescued. She was on a voyage from Savannah, Georgia, United States to Saint John, New Brunswick.
Slater or Slater Rebow	United Kingdom	The ship was driven ashore at Rye, Sussex. She was refloated.

== 10 January ==
List of shipwrecks: 10 January 1847
Ship	State	Description
Argo	Russia	The schooner was driven ashore at Megara Point, Ottoman Empire. She was on a voyage from Odesa to Marseille, Bouches-du-Rhône, France.
Barrosa	United Kingdom	The ship was wrecked at Port Morant, Jamaica due to the negligence of the pilot while carrying coolies from Madras, India to Jamaica. The crew and the 340 emigrants on board were rescued.
Columbia	United States	The whaler, a full-rigged ship, was wrecked on Sydenham's Island, in the Kingsmill Islands. Her crew survived. They were rescued on 30 January by Chandler Price (United Kingdom).
Deux Melanies	France	The brig was wrecked on the Hogsty Reef, in the Bahama Channel. She was on a voyage from Haiti to Havre de Grâce, Seine-Inférieure.
Fuller	United Kingdom	The ship was wrecked on Fish Key, off the Abaco Islands. Her crew were rescued. She was on a voyage from Havana, Cuba to Swansea, Glamorgan.
Minstrel	United Kingdom	The ship was wrecked on the Fish Key, off the Abaco Islands. Her crew were rescued. She was on a voyage from Havana, Cuba to Swansea, Glamorgan.

== 11 January ==
List of shipwrecks: 11 January 1847
Ship	State	Description
Caraibe	French Navy	The paddle frigate was wrecked 5 leagues (15 nautical miles (28 km) north of Saint-Louis, Senegal with the loss of twenty of her crew. She was on a voyage from Saint-Louis to the Canary Islands.
Hayti	United Kingdom	The schooner struck a sunken rock and sank 20 nautical miles (37 km) off North Uist. Outer Hebrides. Her crew survived. she was on a voyage from Westport, County Mayo to Liverpool, Lancashire.
Vailliant	France	The ship ran aground on the Vignette Rocks, off Saint-Nazaire, Loire-Inférieure. She was on a voyage from New Orleans, Louisiana, United States to Saint-Nazaire. She was refloated and beached.

== 12 January ==
List of shipwrecks: 12 January 1847
Ship	State	Description
Edith	France	The ship was driven ashore at Fermanville, Manche. She was o a voyage from Saint Domingo to Havre de Grâce, Seine-Inférieure.
Jane Church	(United Kingdom of Great Britain and Ireland) Gambia Colony and Protectorate	The schooner was beached on the coast of Sierra Leone and broke her back. She was on a voyage from Sierra Leone to the Gambia River.
Jeune Chevalier	France	The ship was destroyed by fire off Cape St. Vincent, Portugal. Her crew were rescued by Earl of Newburgh (United Kingdom). Jeune Chevalier was on a voyage from Rouen, Seine-Inférieure to Marseille, Bouches-du-Rhône.
Maria	Spain	The ship was driven ashore on Carnsore Point, County Wexford, United Kingdom. Her crew were rescued.
Marianne	Bremen	The ship was driven ashore and severely damaged by ice near Cuxhaven.

== 13 January ==
List of shipwrecks: 13 January 1847
Ship	State	Description
Eden	United Kingdom	The ship ran aground and was damaged at North Shields, County Durham.
Harvey	United Kingdom	The ship was wrecked on the Maplin Sand, in the North Sea off the coast of Essex.

== 14 January ==
List of shipwrecks: 14 January 1847
Ship	State	Description
Leda	United Kingdom	The ship was wrecked near Crookhaven, County Cork. Her crew were rescued. She was on a voyage from Liverpool, Lancashire to Limerick.
Maria and Ellen	United Kingdom	The ship collided with another vessel and sank in the Irish Sea. Her crew were rescued by Unity (United Kingdom). Maria and Ellen was on a voyage from Bangor to London.
St. George	United Kingdom	The ship ran aground at Belmullet, County Mayo. She was on a voyage from Plymouth, Devon to Belmullet. She was refloated with assistance from HMS Rhadamanthus (Royal Navy) and taken in to Belmullet.

== 15 January ==
List of shipwrecks: 15 January 1847
Ship	State	Description
Fanny Brooks	United Kingdom	The ship sprang a leak and was beached in Oxwich Bay. She was on a voyage from Llanelly to Bideford, Devon.
Lively	United Kingdom	The ship departed from Saint John's, Newfoundland, British North America for Liverpool, Lancashire. No further trace, presumed foundered with the loss of all hands.
Sunderland	United Kingdom	The brig ran aground on the Sheringham Shoal, in the North Sea off the coast of Norfolk and sank. Her crew were rescued. She was on a voyage from Sunderland, County Durham to London.

== 16 January ==
List of shipwrecks: 16 January 1847
Ship	State	Description
Charlotte	United Kingdom	The ship ran aground on the Goodwin Sands, Kent. She was on a voyage from Boulogne, Pas-de-Calais, France to London. She was refloated.
Edward	United Kingdom	The ship ran aground on the Goodwin Sands. She was refloated and taken in to Ramsgate, Kent.
Jacatra	Netherlands	The ship ran aground at Brouwershaven, Zeeland. She was on a voyage from Batavia, Netherlands East Indies to Rotterdam, South Holland. She was refloated.
Robert Lovely	United Kingdom	The ship departed from Tralee, County Cork for the Clyde. No further trace, presumed foundered with the loss of all hands.
Sirius	United Kingdom	The steamship ran aground and was wrecked off Ballycotton, County Cork with the loss of twenty of the 91 people on board. She was on a voyage from Dublin to Cork.
HMS Sphynx	Royal Navy	The paddle sloop ran aground off Brook, Isle of Wight. Her crew survived. She was on a voyage from Plymouth, Devon to Portsmouth, Hampshire. She was refloated on 5 March and towed in to Portsmouth.

== 17 January ==
List of shipwrecks: 17 January 1847
Ship	State	Description
Active	(United Kingdom of Great Britain and Ireland) British North America	The brigantine was wrecked at Haystack Head, Sable River, Nova Scotia. She was on a voyage from Bermuda to Sydney, Nova Scotia.
Bolivar	United Kingdom	The barque ran aground on the Elbow End Sand, in the North Sea off the mouth of the River Tay and was damaged. She was refloated and taken in to Dundee, Forfarshire.
Prima Donna	United Kingdom	The ship was driven ashore at Wexford. She was on a voyage from Liverpool, Lancashire to São Miguel Island, Azores. She was refloated the next day and taken in to Wexford.
Sir Robert Peel	United Kingdom	The transport ship was wrecked near Cape Three Points, Broken Bay, New South Wales. All on board, nearly 400 people, were rescued. She was on a voyage from Auckland, New Zealand to Sydney, New South Wales.

== 18 January ==
List of shipwrecks: 18 January 1847
Ship	State	Description
Active	United Kingdom	The ship was abandoned in the Atlantic Ocean. Her crew were rescued by Raritan (United Kingdom). Active was on a voyage from Newfoundland, British North America to Portugal.
Ethelbert	United Kingdom	The ship ran aground in the River Lleidi and was wrecked. Sle was on a voyage from Llanelly, Carmarthenshire to London.
Hyena	United Kingdom	The ship was driven ashore at Halifax, Nova Scotia, British North America. She was on a voyage from Trinidad to Halifax. She was declared a total loss.

== 19 January ==
List of shipwrecks: 19 January 1847
Ship	State	Description
Alpha	United Kingdom	The ship ran aground and sank off Stockton-on-Tees, County Durham. Her crew were rescued. She was under tow from Whitby, Yorkshire to South Shields, County Durham.
Beta	United Kingdom	The ship ran aground and capsized at Redcar, Yorkshire. She was under tow from Whitby to South Shields.
Donna Maria	France	The ship was struck rocks and was driven ashore in the Douro with the loss of her captain. She was on a voyage from Havre de Grâce, Seine-Inférieure to Porto, Portugal.
Fairy	United Kingdom	The ship ran aground at Hartlepool, County Durham. She floated off but consequently sank. She was refloated and beached.
Irvine	United Kingdom	The ship ran aground on the Insand, in the North Sea off the coast of County Durham. She was on a voyage from Quebec City, Province of Canada, British North America to Sunderland, County Durham.
Marys	United Kingdom	The ship ran aground at Port Talbot, Glamorgan. She was refloated the next day.
Vansittart	United Kingdom	The ship ran aground on the Double Ledge, off the coast of Devon. She was on a voyage from Middlesbrough, Yorkshire to Exmouth, Devon. She was refloated and taken in to Exmouth in a leaky condition.
Villebrequin	France	The ship was wrecked near Argenton. Her crew were rescued. She was on a voyage from Landernau, Finistère to Rouen, Seine-Inférieure.
Whitwell Grange	United Kingdom	The ship was driven ashore near King's Lynn, Norfolk. She was on a voyage from Saint Andrews, Fife to King's Lynn. She was refloated on 22 January.

== 20 January ==
List of shipwrecks: 20 January 1847
Ship	State	Description
Admiral Benbow	United Kingdom	The ship ran aground and was damaged on the Scroby Sands, Norfolk. She was refloated and taken in to Great Yarmouth, Norfolk.
Alexander	United Kingdom	The ship ran aground on the Wicklow Bank, in the Irish Sea and sank. She was on a voyage from Llanelly, Glamorgan to Newry, County Antrim.
Cincinnati	United States	The steamship foundered in the Gulf of Mexico.
Etna	French Navy	The Sphinx-class aviso was wrecked near Cape Ténès, Algeria. All on board were rescued.
Fashion	United States	The steamship foundered in the Gulf of Mexico with the loss of all hands.
Snowden	United Kingdom	The ship ran aground and was damaged at the mouth of the Brass River. She was on a voyage from the Brass River to Liverpool, Lancashire. She was refloated.

== 21 January ==
List of shipwrecks: 22 January 1847
Ship	State	Description
Cleopatra	United Kingdom	The ship was wrecked on the Brouwer Shoals, in Netherlands East Indies waters. Her crew were rescued. She was on a voyage from Canton, China to Montreal, Province of Canada, British North America.
Cubit	United Kingdom	The ship ran aground off Great Yarmouth, Norfolk. She was refloated and resumed her voyage.

== 22 January ==
List of shipwrecks: 22 January 1847
Ship	State	Description
Charles	United Kingdom	The ship sank off Sharp's Nose, Devon. Her crew were rescued. She was on a voyage from Belfast, County Antrim to Newport, Monmouthshire.
Fishburn	United Kingdom	The ship was driven ashore and damaged in the River Nene. She was on a voyage from Seaham, County Durham to Wisbech, Cambridgeshire. She was refloated.
Harlington	United Kingdom	The ship ran aground on the Knowl, in the North Sea off the coast of Norfolk. She was on a voyage from Portsmouth, Hampshire to Sunderland, County Durham. She was refloated and resumed her voyage.
Itenerant	United Kingdom	The ship ran aground on the Sizewell Banks, in the North Sea off the coast of Suffolk. She was on a voyage from Sunderland to London. She was refloated and taken in to Harwich, Essex in a leaky condition.
Loyalty	United Kingdom	The brig ran aground on the Cross Sand, in the North Sea off the coast of Norfolk. She was refloated.
Margaret and Ann	United Kingdom	The schooner ran aground and was damaged on the Shipwash Sand, in the North Sea off the coast of Essex. She was refloated and beacned at Wivenhoe, Essex.
Moslem	Netherlands	The ship ran aground on Looe Key. She was on a voyage from Amsterdam, North Holland to New Orleans, Louisiana, United States. She had been refloated by 30 January and made for Key West, Florida, United States.
Nonatum	United Kingdom	The ship ran aground on the Formby Spit, in Liverpool Bay. She was on a voyage from Charleston, South Carolina, United States to Liverpool, Lancashire. She was refloated.
Raven	United Kingdom	The schooner was wrecked on the east coast of Rathlin Island, County Antrim. Her crew were rescued.
Robert and Ellen	United Kingdom	The brig was driven ashore at Lowestoft, Suffolk. She was on a voyage from Chatham, Kent to Newcastle upon Tyne, Northumberland. She was refloated and put in to Great Yarmouth, Norfolk in a leaky condition.

== 23 January ==
List of shipwrecks: 23 January 1847
Ship	State	Description
Amazon	United Kingdom	The brig was in collision with the brig Magdalene off the coast of Suffolk and was beached on the Corton Sand. Magdalene towed her to Lowestoft. She was taken in to port on 25 January.
Balance	United States	The freight schooner was lost near Cape May. Crew saved.
Blackett	United Kingdom	The ship was driven ashore near the Dungeness Lighthouse, Kent. She was on a voyage from Sunderland, County Durham to Portsmouth, Hampshire. She was refloated and resumed her voyage.
Blixten	Sweden	The ship ran aground on the Buxey Sand, in the North Sea off the coast of Suffolk. She was on a voyage from Stockholm to Gibraltar. She was refloated and assisted in to Harwich, Essex, United Kingdom.
British Sovereign	United Kingdom	The ship was departed from Twofold Bay for Wellington, New Zealand. No further trace, presumed foundered with the loss of all hands.
Ettore	Trieste	The ship was driven ashore near Skibbereen, County Cork, United Kingdom. Her crew were rescued. She was on a voyage from Trieste to Falmouth, Cornwall, United Kingdom.
Evelina	United Kingdom	The brig struck the Rigg Bank, in the Irish Sea and was abandoned. She subsequently came ashore at Cranstel, Isle of Man and was wrecked. Her crew were rescued. She was on a voyage from Workington, Cumberland to Dublin.
Glenco	United Kingdom	The ship was driven ashore at Kilrush, County Clare.
John Quayle	(United Kingdom of Great Britain and Ireland) Isle of Man	The smack was wrecked in Ballymastochter Bay. Her crew were rescued. She was on a voyage from Tralee, County Kerry to Liverpool, Lancashire.
Mandigo	United Kingdom	The ship ran aground on the Cork Sand, in the North Sea off the coast of Essex. She was refloated.
Unity	United Kingdom	The ship ran aground and was damaged on the Gunfleet Sand, in the North Sea off the coast of Essex. She was on a voyage from London to Great Yarmouth, Norfolk. She was refloated and taken in to Harwich in a severely damaged condition.

== 24 January ==
List of shipwrecks: 24 January 1847
Ship	State	Description
Abigail	United Kingdom	The ship was driven ashore at Westport, County Mayo.
Albina	United Kingdom	The ship was wrecked on Valencia Island, County Cork. Her crew were rescued. She was on a voyage from Halifax, Nova Scotia, British North America to Liverpool, Lancashire.
Agenoria	United Kingdom	The ship was driven ashore at Kilrush, County Clare.
Alliance	United Kingdom	The ship was driven ashore and wrecked near Bridlington, Yorkshire. She was on a voyage from Great Yarmouth, Norfolk to Sunderland, County Durham.
Anne	United Kingdom	The ship was driven ashore at Kilrush.
Blanch	United Kingdom	The ship was driven ashore at Donegal.
Caroline	United Kingdom	The ship was driven ashore and wrecked at Kilrush. She was on a voyage from Limerick to Constantinople, Ottoman Empire.
Celerity	United Kingdom	The ship was driven ashore at Great Yarmouth.
Ciro	Flag unknown	The ship was driven ashore and wrecked at Kilrush. She was on a voyage from Limerick to Trieste.
Commerce	United Kingdom	The ship was driven ashore on Oyster Island, County Sligo.
Cullooney	United Kingdom	The ship was driven ashore on Oyster Island.
Doncaster	United Kingdom	The ship ran aground on the Sizewell Bank, in the North Sea off the coast of Suffolk. She was refloated and taken in to Great Yarmouth in a leaky condition.
Edward	United Kingdom	The ship was driven ashore at Kilrush.
Eleanor	United Kingdom	The schooner was driven ashore on Inniscoo, County Donegal. She was refloated.
Eliza and Ann	United Kingdom	The ship was driven ashore at Kilrush.
Elizabeth	United Kingdom	The ship was driven ashore at Kilrush.
Elizabeth Mary	United Kingdom	The schooner was driven ashore on Inniscoo. She was refloated.
Emma Prescott	United States	The ship was driven ashore at Galway, United Kingdom.
Exile	United States	The ship was driven ashore near Crookhaven, County Cork.
Frances and Mary	United Kingdom	The ship was driven ashore at Sligo.
Friendship	United Kingdom	The ship was driven ashore at Kilrush.
Gipsey	United Kingdom	The brig was driven ashore and wrecked at Hayling Island, Hampshire with the loss of one of her ten crew. Survivors were rescued by the Coast Guard. She was on a voyage from Hull, Yorkshire to Cork.
Glencoe	United Kingdom	The ship was driven ashore at Kilrush.
Heart of Oak	United Kingdom	The ship was severely damaged in a gale at Kilrush.
Jessy McCaskill	United Kingdom	The ship was driven ashore and wrecked at Stornoway, Isle of Lewis, Outer Hebrides. Her crew were rescued.
Lochmaddy	United Kingdom	The ship was driven ashore and wrecked at Stornoway. Her crew were rescued.
Maas	United Kingdom	The ship was driven ashore and wrecked at Kilrush.
Manchester	United States	The ship capsized at Galway.
Margaret Hughes	United States	The ship was driven ashore at Milltown Malbay, County Clare. She was on a voyage from Baltimore, Maryland to Liverpool.
Mary	United Kingdom	The ship was driven ashore and wrecked in Chapel Bay, Copeland Islands, County Down.
Marwood	United Kingdom	The ship was wrecked off the "Terroe Islands". Her crew were rescued. She was on a voyage from Bonny, Africa to Liverpool.
Nelson	United Kingdom	The ship was driven ashore and damaged at Westport.
Olive Branch	United Kingdom	The schooner was driven ashore on Inniscoo. She was refloated on 26 January.
Po	United Kingdom	The schooner was abandoned in the North Sea off the coast of Fife. Her crew were rescued by the Saint Andrews Lifeboat. She was subsequently taken in to Dundee, Forfarshire.
Redwing	United Kingdom	The ship was driven ashore at Galway.
Spring	United Kingdom	The ship ran aground on the Cutler Sand in the North Sea off the coast of Suffolk. She was on a voyage from South Shields, County Durham to London. She was refloated and taken in to Harwich, Essex in a leaky condition.
St. George	United Kingdom	The ship was driven ashore at Belmullet, County Mayo.
St. Lawrence	United Kingdom	The ship ran aground on the Scroby Sands, Norfolk. She was on a voyage from London to Newcastle upon Tyne, Northumberland. She was refloated and resumed her voyage.
Thomas Gales	United Kingdom	The ship ran aground on the Gunfleet Sand, in the North Sea off the coast of Essex. She was on a voyage from Stockton on Tees, County Durham to London. She was refloated the next day with the assistance of HMRC Desmond ( Board of Customs) and two smacks.
William	United Kingdom	The schooner was driven ashore and damaged on Rutland, County Donegal. She was placed under repair.

== 25 January ==
List of shipwrecks: 25 January 1847
Ship	State	Description
Alabama	United States	The ship was wrecked on Valentia Island, County Kerry, United Kingdom. Her crew were rescued. She was on a voyage from Cumberland, Nova Scotia, British North America to Liverpool, Lancashire, United Kingdom.
Elizabeth	United Kingdom	The ship was driven ashore and damaged at Douglas, Isle of Man. She was refloated.
Lord Auckland	(United Kingdom of Great Britain and Ireland) New Zealand	The ship was driven ashore and severely damaged at Port Curtis, New South Wales. She was refloated, repaired and returned to service.

== 26 January ==
List of shipwrecks: 26 January 1847
Ship	State	Description
Arab	United Kingdom	The ship was driven ashore at Swansea, Glamorgan.
Commerce	United Kingdom	The ship was driven ashore at Brown Down, Hampshire. She was refloated on 29 January.
Eden	Kingdom of Lombardy–Venetia	The ship was driven ashore and wrecked in Broadhaven Bay. Her crew were rescued. She was on a voyage from Venice to Cork and Liverpool, Lancashire, United Kingdom.
Eston Nab	United Kingdom	The ship was driven ashore at Stockton-on-Tees, County Durham. She was on a voyage from London to Stockton-on-Tees. She was refloated and towed in to the River Tees in a leaky condition.
Favourite	United Kingdom	The ship ran aground on the Newcombe Sand, in the North Sea off the coast of Suffolk. She was refloated.
Garrick	United Kingdom	The ship was driven ashore near New York, United States. She was on a voyage from Liverpool to New York. She was refloated on 29 January.
Marmood	United Kingdom	The ship sank at Fugloy, Faroe Islands with the loss of four of her crew. She was on a voyage from Liverpool to Africa.

== 27 January ==
List of shipwrecks: 27 January 1847
Ship	State	Description
Ann and Margaret	United Kingdom	The ship was driven ashore at Dundee, Forfarshire.
Bamborough Castle	United Kingdom	The schooner was driven ashore and severely damaged at Hull, Yorkshire.
Chase	United Kingdom	The ship was in collision with a brig and was then run into by another brig and was abandoned off Pakefield, Suffolk. Her crew were rescued by Patriot (United Kingdom). Chase was subsequently towed in to Lowestoft, Suffolk.
Eliza	United Kingdom	The ship was driven ashore at Bristol, Gloucestershire. She was on a voyage from Bristol to Jamaica.
Eliza	United Kingdom	The ship was driven ashore at Stornoway, Isle of Lewis, Outer Hebrides. She was refloated with assistance from HMRC Wellington ( Board of Customs ).
Endeavour	United Kingdom	The trow sank at the mouth of the River Avon with the loss of two of her five crew. She was on a voyage from Cardiff, Glamorgan to Bristol.
Gipsy	United Kingdom	The snow was stranded, and filled, near Hayling Island, Hampshire in a gale during a voyage from Hull, Yorkshire to Cork, Ireland. She later broke up.
John Edward	United Kingdom	The ship was driven ashore and wrecked at White Cove, Nova Scotia, British North America with the loss of a crew member. She was on a voyage from Saint John, New Brunswick, British North America to Boston, Massachusetts, United States.
Niobe	United States	The barque was driven ashore and wrecked in Ballyteague Bay. Her crew were rescued. She was on a voyage from New York City to Cork, United Kingdom.
Sampsona	Kingdom of Sardinia	The barque was abandoned in the Atlantic Ocean. Her crew were rescued by Epaminondas (United States). Sampsona was on a voyage from Genoa to Cork. She was subsequently boarded by five crew of Jamaica (United Kingdom) and taken in to Waterford, where she arrived on 29 January.
Star	United Kingdom	The steamship was driven ashore at Penarth Glamorgan.

== 28 January ==
List of shipwrecks: 28 January 1847
Ship	State	Description
Andelle	France	The full-rigged ship was severely damaged in a squall at New Orleans, Louisiana, United States.
Andromeda	United Kingdom	The barque was abandoned in the Atlantic Ocean (43°47′N 10°47′W). Her crew were rescued by Bangalore ( India). Andromeda was on a voyage from Patagonia, Argentina to Falmouth, Cornwall.
Ann Eliza	(United Kingdom of Great Britain and Ireland) Saint Kitts	The sloop capsized at Saint Kitts. She was consequently condemned.
Charlotte Harrison	United Kingdom	The ship was severely damaged in a squall at New Orleans.
Earl Grey	United Kingdom	The ship was wrecked at Gibraltar. She was on a voyage from Patras, Greece to Liverpool, Lancashire.
Henry Gardner	United States	The ship was severely damaged in a squall at New Orleans.
Independence	United Kingdom	The ship was severely damaged in a squall at New Orleans.
New York Packet	United Kingdom	The ship was severely damaged in a squall at New Orleans.
Queen Pomare	United Kingdom	The ship was severely damaged in a squall at New Orleans.
Sarah	United States	The ship was wrecked on Ennis Quay Island, in Blacksod Bay, County Mayo, United Kingdom with the loss of all but one of her crew. She was on a voyage from New York to Galway, United Kingdom.
Sisters	(United Kingdom of Great Britain and Ireland) British North America	The ship was abandoned in the Atlantic Ocean. All on board were rescued by Winneganee (Flag unknown). Sisters was on a voyage from Halifax, Nova Scotia to Saint John's, Newfoundland.

== 29 January ==
List of shipwrecks: 29 January 1847
Ship	State	Description
Baltic	(United Kingdom of Great Britain and Ireland) British North America	The ship was driven ashore and wrecked near Saint John, New Brunswick. She was on a voyage from Saint John to New York, United States.
Clown	United Kingdom	The schooner ran aground on the Great Burbo Bank, in Liverpool Bay. She was on a voyage from Liverpool, Lancashire to Glasgow, Renfrewshire. She was refloated the next day and put back to Liverpool.
Elizabeth	United Kingdom	The ship was abandoned in the Atlantic Ocean. Her crew were rescued. She was on a voyage from Genoa, Kingdom of Sardinia to Falmouth, Cornwall.
Elizabeth Barnes	(United Kingdom of Great Britain and Ireland) Saint Lucia	The ship was driven ashore and severely damaged on Saint Lucia. She was refloated.

== 31 January ==
List of shipwrecks: 31 January 1847
Ship	State	Description
Betsey Wood	United Kingdom	The ship was driven ashore at Westport, County Mayo. She was on a voyage from Belfast, County Antrim to Wesport. She was refloated and taken in to Westport.
Eliza Thornton	United States	The ship ran aground on the Pickles Reef. She was on a voyage from New Orleans, Louisiana to Nantes, Loire-Inférieure, France.

== Unknown date ==
List of shipwrecks: Unknown date in January 1847
Ship	State	Description
Ann	United Kingdom	The ship was abandoned in the Atlantic Ocean before 13 January.
Antelope	United Kingdom	The ship was lost in the Rio Grande before 30 January.
Caroline	United Kingdom	The ship ran aground on the Buxey Sand, in the North Sea off the coast of Suffolk. She was refloated and taken in to Harwich, Essex.
Chomley	United Kingdom	The ship was wrecked at Great Yarmouth, Norfolk. Her crew were rescued.
Conrad	Bremen	The ship was wrecked on the Middle Sand, in the North Sea off the coast of Essex. Her crew were rescued by HMRC Desmond ( Board of Customs). Conrad was on a voyage from Hartlepool, County Durham, United Kingdom to the West Indies.
David	(United Kingdom of Great Britain and Ireland) British North America	The ship was abandoned in the Atlantic Ocean before 30 January. Her four crew were rescued by Eleutheria (United Kingdom).
Eliezer	United Kingdom	The ship was wrecked on the Gunfleet Sand, in the North Sea off the coast of Essex. Her crew survived.
Emile	France	The ship was wrecked on Minorca, Spain with some loss of life. She was on a voyage from Seaham, County Durham to Cette, Hérault.
Esther	United Kingdom	The ship was wrecked on South Georgia before 1 February with the loss of eleven crew.
Frederike	Kingdom of Hanover	The koff was damaged by fire at Hamburg before 8 January.
Fyra Sonnet	Russia	The ship was driven ashore and wrecked on Tenedos, Ottoman Empire before 20 January. She was on a voyage from Odesa to Cork or Falmouth, Cornwall, United Kingdom.
Hebe	United Kingdom	The ship was wrecked before 7 January. She was on a voyage from Singapore to China.
Independence, or Independent	United Kingdom	The barque was abandoned in the Atlantic Ocean before 3 January.
Margaret	United Kingdom	The ship was wrecked on the Longsand, in the North Sea off the coast of Essex. Her crew were rescued by HMRC Desmond ( Board of Customs). Margaret was on a voyage from Danzig to Weymouth, Dorset.
Milo	United Kingdom	The ship was wrecked on Cape Sable Island, Nova Scotia, British North America before 27 January. All on board were rescued. She was on a voyage from Liverpool, Lancashire to Boston, Massachusetts, United States.
Ocean Bride	United Kingdom	The ship ran aground on the Middle Sand, in the North Sea off the coast of Essex. She was refloated but consequently sank Her crew were rescued by HMRC Desmond ( Board of Customs).
Planter	United Kingdom	The ship was abandoned in the Atlantic Ocean before 17 January.
Priscilla	United Kingdom	The ship was wrecked on the Whitaker Sand, in the North Sea off the coast of Suffolk.
Reis Effendi	(United Kingdom of Great Britain and Ireland) Jamaica	The brigantine was wrecked on "Caymanas". Her crew were rescued. She was on a voyage from Kingston to Veracruz, Mexico.
Richmond Lass	United Kingdom	The brig was abandoned in the Atlantic Ocean off Cape Clear Island, County Cork before 11 January.
Royal Tar	United Kingdom	The ship was wrecked at Galibia, Beylik of Tunis. She was on a voyage from Alexandria to an English port.
San Joaquin	Spain	The ship was wrecked near Castletown, Isle of Man before 16 January.
Santa Cruz	Portugal	The ship was abandoned in the Atlantic Ocean. Her crew were rescued by Beranger (France). Santa Cruz was on a voyage from Viana do Castelo to Cork.
Sea Nymph	(United Kingdom of Great Britain and Ireland) British North America	The ship was abandoned in the Atlantic Ocean before 20 January.
Skylark	United Kingdom	The schooner departed from Swansea, Glamorgan for São Miguel Island, Azores. No further trace, presumed foundered with the loss of all hands.
Venilia	United Kingdom	The ship was abandoned in the Atlantic Ocean before 5 January. She came ashore and was wrecked at La Poile, Newfoundland, British North America on 9 January.
Vivat	Bremen	The ship was driven ashore at Wremen. She was on a voyage from Saint Domingo to Bremen. She was refloated on 5 January and taken in to Bremerhaven.
X. L.	United Kingdom	The ship ran aground on the Stirrup Keys. She was on a voyage from Havana, Cuba to Cork. She was refloated and resumed her voyage.
Zadora	Netherlands	The ship ran aground near Havana before 25 January. She was on a voyage from Bordeaux, Gironde, France to Havana.
