= 2003 Chichester District Council election =

2003 UK local government election

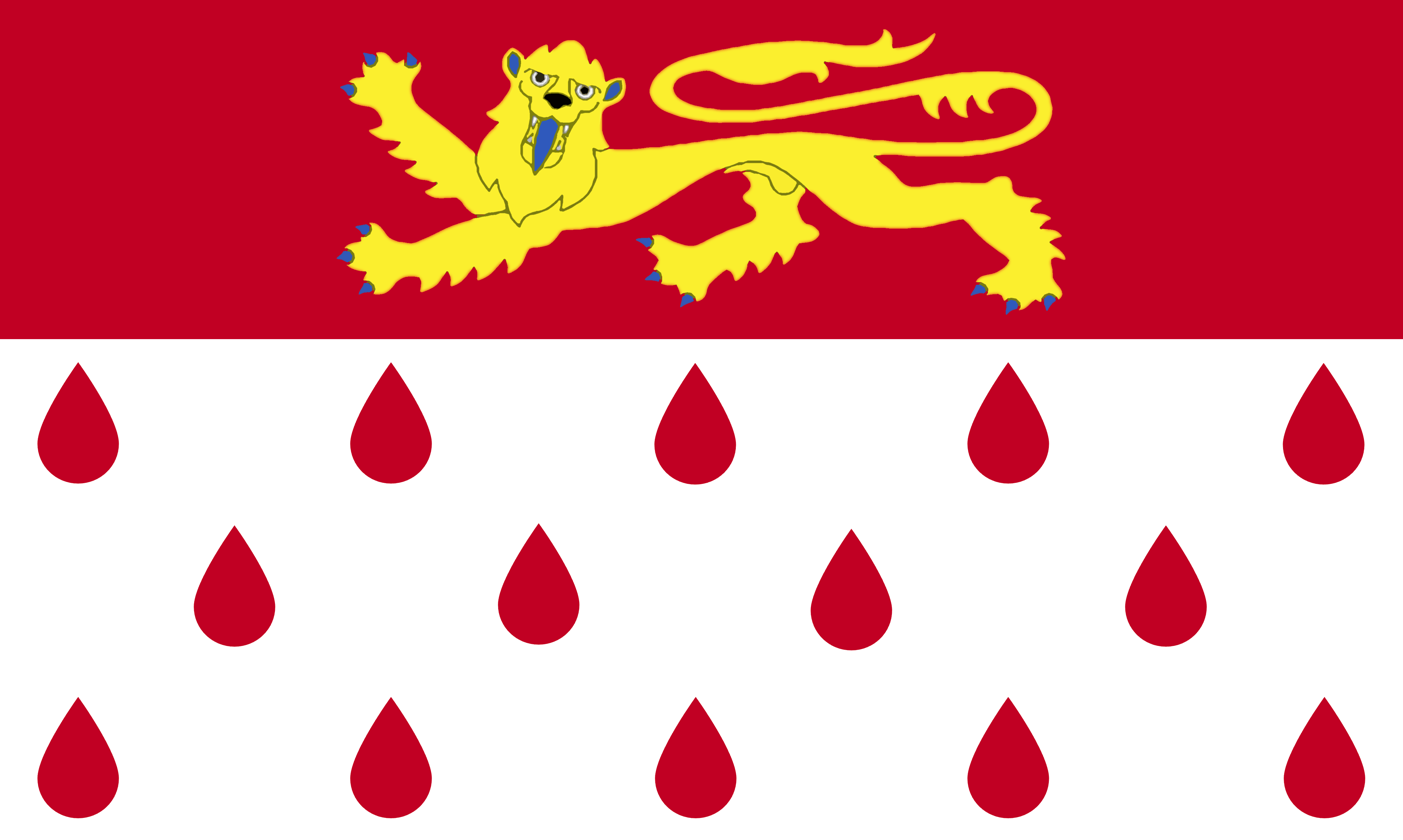
← 1999	1 May 2003	2007 →

All 48 seats to Chichester District Council 25 seats needed for a majority
	First party	Second party
Party	Conservative	Liberal Democrats
Seats won	26	21
Popular vote	23,680	20,153
Percentage	44.5%	37.9%
- Map of the election
Council control before election
Conservative
Council control after election
Conservative

Elections to Chichester District Council in West Sussex, United Kingdom were held on 1 May 2003. The whole council was up for election and the Conservative Party held overall control.

== Election result ==
Chichester District Council Election Result 2003
Party	Seats	Gains	Losses	Net gain/loss	Seats %	Votes %	Votes	+/−
Conservative	26	0	0	0	54.2	44.5	23,680	
Liberal Democrats	21	0	0	0	43.7	37.9	20,153	
Independent	1	0	0	0	2.1	2.3	1,220	
Labour	0	0	0	0	0	9.2	4,913	
UKIP	0	0	0	0	0	4.8	2,559	
Green	0	0	0	0	0	1.3	715	

1 Independent candidate was unopposed.

↓
26	21	1
Conservative	Liberal Democrat	I.

== Ward results ==
Bosham (2 seats)
Party	Candidate	Votes	%	±%
Conservative	David John Myers	649	26.2	
Conservative	Myles Antony Cullen	623	25.1	
Independent	Clifford Michael Archer	588	23.7	
Liberal Democrats	Gerald Patrick Lynch	441	17.8	
UKIP	Douglas Ernest Denny	178	7.2	
Turnout		2479	42.5	

Boxgrove (1 seat)
Party	Candidate	Votes	%	±%
Liberal Democrats	Michael Norman Hall	431	51.1	
Conservative	Jane Louise Chevis	358	42.5	
UKIP	Antony Edward Bird	54	6.4	
Turnout		843	47.2	

Bury (1 seat)
Party	Candidate	Votes	%	±%
Conservative	Susan Mary Hallock	481	70.1	
Liberal Democrats	Paul Ernest Wellstead	205	29.9	
Turnout		686	38.7	

Chichester East (3 seats)
Party	Candidate	Votes	%	±%
Liberal Democrats	Quentin Robson Cox	653	19.0	
Liberal Democrats	Anthony John French	639	18.6	
Liberal Democrats	Eva Marliese French	635	18.5	
Conservative	Rebecca Elizabeth Harris	304	8.8	
Conservative	Gina Margaret Simpson	283	8.2	
UKIP	Nigel Degge Wilmot Sitwell	247	7.2	
Green	Josephine Eckhard	191	5.6	
Labour	Peter John Nutt	191	5.6	
Labour	John Smith	156	4.5	
Labour	Doris Bryson Walton	141	4.1	
Turnout		3440	24.5	

Chichester North (3 seats)
Party	Candidate	Votes	%	±%
Liberal Democrats	Gloria Patricia Hooley	1002	17.7	
Liberal Democrats	Edith Pingree	961	17.0	
Liberal Democrats	Richard Edward Plowman	903	15.9	
Conservative	Stuart Ian King	731	12.9	
Conservative	Nicholas Hart Roberts	715	12.6	
Conservative	Timothy John Roberts	640	11.3	
UKIP	Michael Alan Mason	205	3.6	
Green	Valerie Anne Briginshaw	173	3.1	
Labour	David Morrison	122	2.2	
Labour	John Wallace Barr	117	2.1	
Labour	Frances Turner	98	1.7	
Turnout		5667	43.1	

Chichester South (3 seats)
Party	Candidate	Votes	%	±%
Liberal Democrats	Anne Mary Dorothy Scicluna	876	20.5	
Liberal Democrats	Alan David Chaplin	741	17.4	
Liberal Democrats	David John Siggs	753	17.6	
Conservative	Hilary Anne Flynn	377	8.8	
Conservative	Dorothy June Spirit	365	8.5	
Conservative	Robin William Bell	336	7.9	
Labour	John Bennett	214	5.0	
UKIP	Anne Patricia Craven	159	3.7	
Labour	Benjamin Earnshaw-Mansell	154	3.6	
Labour	Susan Mary Barnardo Bramwell-Smith	151	3.5	
Green	Prudence Dwyer	149	3.5	
Turnout		4275	31.1	

Chichester West (2 seats)
Party	Candidate	Votes	%	±%
Liberal Democrats	Clare Margaret Apel	655	30.0	
Liberal Democrats	Michael Raymond Shone	628	28.7	
Conservative	Julie Ann Rooker	414	19.0	
UKIP	James McCulloch	205	9.4	
Labour	Andrew Emerson	165	7.6	
Labour	Margaret Denis	116	5.3	
Turnout		2183	33.2	

Donnington (1 seat)
Party	Candidate	Votes	%	±%
Conservative	John Ridd	356	49.9	
Liberal Democrats	Alan George Wells	312	43.7	
Labour	Micheline Lawson	46	6.4	
Turnout		714	41.2	

Easebourne (1 seat)
Party	Candidate	Votes	%	±%
Liberal Democrats	Michael Alan Fay	344	51.0	
Conservative	Norma Dorothy Graves	331	49.0	
Turnout		675	35.7	

East Wittering (2 seats)
Party	Candidate	Votes	%	±%
Conservative	Karen Marion Graham Clay	524	25.1	
Liberal Democrats	Dr Mary Ellen Green	485	23.2	
Conservative	Thea Pauline Hucklesby	412	19.7	
Labour	Celia Anne Barlow	221	10.6	
Labour	Patrick Joseph O'Sullivan	188	9.0	
UKIP	Gordon Alexander Simpson	148	7.2	
Green	Jacqueline Susan Taylor	109	5.2	
Turnout		2087	35.1	

Fernhurst (2 seats)
Party	Candidate	Votes	%	±%
Liberal Democrats	John Cheason Mitchell	718	25.9	
Conservative	Heather Penelope Caird	606	21.9	
Liberal Democrats	William Edwin Quinn	593	21.4	
Independent	Dr Mamdouh George Salameh	450	16.2	
Conservative	Nola Jane Hendon	405	14.6	
Turnout		2772	39.8	
Conservative hold		Swing		

Fishbourne (1 seat)
Party	Candidate	Votes	%	±%
Liberal Democrats	Adrian Geoffrey Frank Moss	607	73.1	
Conservative	Clifford William Spawton	223	26.9	
Turnout		830	52.5	

Funtington (1 seat)
Party	Candidate	Votes	%	±%
Conservative	Frank Ernest Garrett	542	69.0	
Liberal Democrats	John Cooper Rankin	243	31.0	
Turnout		785	38.4	

Harting (1 seat)
Party	Candidate	Votes	%	±%
Independent	Andrew Michael Shaxson (Re-elected Unopposed)	n/a	n/a	

Lavant (1 seat)
Party	Candidate	Votes	%	±%
Liberal Democrats	Andrew Robert Homan Smith	442	72.9	
Conservative	Mary Louise Goldsmith	164	27.1	
Turnout		606	36.8	

Midhurst (2 seats)
Party	Candidate	Votes	%	±%
Conservative	Alan Joseph Robert Cartwright	678	30.1	
Conservative	Brian John Weekes	587	26.2	
Liberal Democrats	Judith Russell Fowler	532	23.6	
Liberal Democrats	Robert Humphrey Bourchier Devereux	453	20.1	
Turnout		2250	30.7	

North Mundham (1 seat)
Party	Candidate	Votes	%	±%
Liberal Democrats	Stephen Quigley	368	55.8	
Conservative	Anthony Peter Dignum	292	44.2	
Turnout		660	39.7	

Petworth (2 seats)
Party	Candidate	Votes	%	±%
Conservative	Janet Elizabeth Duncton	952	35.5	
Conservative	Margaret Valerie Field	808	30.2	
Liberal Democrats	Sarah Margaret Barstow	477	17.8	
Liberal Democrats	Catherine Gillian Alderson Perschke	442	16.5	
Turnout		2679	38.3	

Plaistow (2 seats)
Party	Candidate	Votes	%	±%
Conservative	Brian James Hooton	677	31.9	
Conservative	Anthony Malcolm Walker	667	31.4	
Liberal Democrats	Raymond Ernest John Cooper	397	18.7	
Liberal Democrats	Paul Colville	383	18.0	
Turnout		2124	30.9	

Rogate (1 seat)
Party	Candidate	Votes	%	±%
Conservative	Patricia Ann Janes	531	60.8	
Liberal Democrats	Kevin George Campbell	254	29.0	
UKIP	Ashley Mote	89	10.2	
Turnout		874	41.2	

Selsey North (3 seats)
Party	Candidate	Votes	%	±%
Conservative	Melva Kathleen Bateman	694	19.4	
Conservative	Stewart Marr Adamson	657	18.4	
Conservative	Alan John Dyer	615	17.2	
Labour	Ian Bell	457	12.8	
Labour	Margaret Dyer	451	12.6	
Labour	Wendy Virginia Pengelly	414	11.5	
UKIP	Andrew Edward Wilkinson	291	8.1	
Turnout		3579	28.3	

Selsey South (2 seats)
Party	Candidate	Votes	%	±%
Conservative	Albert Edward Vines	567	27.3	
Conservative	John Thomas Curtis	551	26.6	
Labour	Janet Cynthia Miller	324	15.6	
UKIP	Bernard Arthur Smith	321	15.5	
Labour	Sidney William Hoy	312	15.0	
Turnout		2075	33.3	

Sidlesham (1 seat)
Party	Candidate	Votes	%	±%
Liberal Democrats	Diana Joy Pound	295	47.4	
Independent	Patricia Mary Tull	182	29.3	
Labour	Robert Harvey Jaffa	79	12.7	
UKIP	Derek Hunnikin	66	10.6	
Turnout		622	34.6	

Southbourne (3 seats)
Party	Candidate	Votes	%	±%
Conservative	Mary Marrs	743	16.1	
Conservative	Graham Hamilton Hicks	739	16.0	
Liberal Democrats	Barbara Gowlett	684	14.8	
Conservative	Nigel Charles Brown	679	14.7	
Liberal Democrats	James Richard Jennings	623	13.5	
Liberal Democrats	Penelope Anne Blackmore	530	11.5	
UKIP	Alicia Ruth Denny	170	3.7	
Labour	June Mary Leonard	159	3.4	
Labour	Duncan Hollowood	149	3.2	
Labour	Marguerite Lawrence	145	3.1	
Turnout		4621	30.7	

Stedham (1 seat)
Party	Candidate	Votes	%	±%
Conservative	John Lorraine Cherry	547	67.8	
Liberal Democrats	Daniel John Warner	260	32.2	
Turnout		807	43.1	

Tangmere (1 seat)
Party	Candidate	Votes	%	±%
Liberal Democrats	Joyce Meyer	258	52.1	
Conservative	Paul Newton-Lewis	204	41.2	
Labour	Andrew Young	33	6.7	
Turnout		495	28.7	

Westbourne (1 seat)
Party	Candidate	Votes	%	±%
Conservative	Maureen Eleanor Elliott	391	63.7	
Labour	John Baker	122	19.9	
UKIP	Reginald Rodger Willoughby Musgrave	101	16.4	
Turnout		614	36.5	

West Wittering (2 seats)
Party	Candidate	Votes	%	±%
Conservative	Anthony John Davies	938	31.1	
Conservative	Peter Edward Jones	843	27.9	
Liberal Democrats	Roger Walter Tilbury	346	11.5	
UKIP	Roger Lewis Wilson	325	10.8	
Liberal Democrats	Simon Green	285	9.4	
Labour	Gordon Trevor Churchill	107	3.5	
Green	Joan Marjorie Welch	93	3.1	
Labour	Kenneth Alex Newman	81	2.7	
Turnout		3018	40.8	

Wisborough Green (1 seat)
Party	Candidate	Votes	%	±%
Conservative	Robert Harry Field	481	61.7	
Liberal Democrats	John Edward Barstow	299	38.3	
Turnout		780	40.8	

== By-Election results ==
See Chichester local elections for by-election results after this election.
