= A. J. Mills =

A. J. Mills may refer to:

- A. J. Mills (politician)
- A. J. Mills (songwriter)
