= Fishburne =

Fishburne may refer to:

== People with the surname ==
- John W. Fishburne, American politician
- Laurence Fishburne, American actor
- Lillian E. Fishburne, American admiral

== Other uses ==
- Fishburne Military School

== See also ==
- Fishburn (disambiguation)
- Fishbourne (disambiguation)
