= Mike Peacock =

English footballer (born 1940)

Personal information
- Full name: Michael Richards Peacock
- Date of birth: 28 September 1940 (age 86)
- Place of birth: Fishburn, County Durham, England
- Position: Goalkeeper

Youth career
- –: Fishburn Juniors

Senior career*
Years	Team	Apps	(Gls)
–	Shildon		
1960–1963	Darlington	46	(0)
–	Shildon		
- * Club domestic league appearances and goals

Michael Richards Peacock (born 28 September 1940) is an English former footballer who made 46 appearances in the Football League playing as a goalkeeper for Darlington in the early 1960s. He also played non-league football for clubs including Shildon.
