= Fishburn Airfield =

- IATA: none; ICAO: GB-0002

Summary
- Airport type: Private
- Owner/Operator: Fishburn Airfield Ltd.
- Location: Fishburn
- Elevation AMSL: 377 ft / 115 m
- Coordinates: 54°41′18″N 001°27′51″W

Map
- Location in County Durham

Runways
Direction	Length		Surface
Direction	ft	m	Surface
08/26	2,590	790	Grass

Fishburn Airfield is a small grass strip airfield in Fishburn, County Durham.

The airfield was opened on 30 June 1995 by the then local MP and Leader of the Opposition Tony Blair. It was named as "Airfield of the year" by aviation magazine Flyer in 2004 for its welcoming atmosphere and bacon butties.

In 2005, the airfield hosted filming for a scene from the Bollywood film Hari Puttar: A Comedy of Terrors
