= 2007 Chichester District Council election =

2007 UK local government election

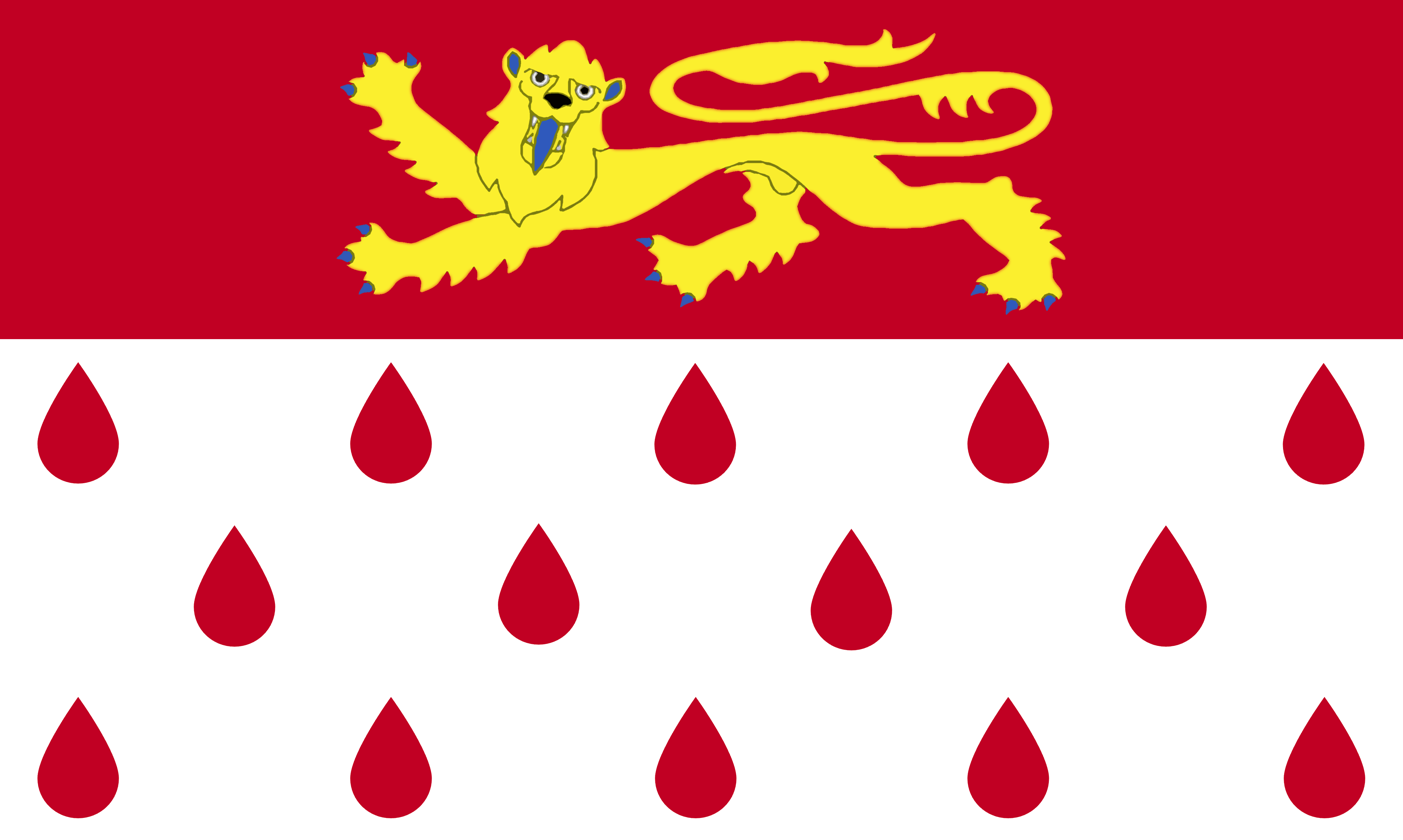
← 2003	3 May 2007	2011 →

All 48 seats to Chichester District Council 25 seats needed for a majority
	First party	Second party
Party	Conservative	Liberal Democrats
Last election	26	21
Seats won	34	11
Seat change	▲8	▼10
Popular vote	32,611	20,005
Percentage	52.9%	32.5%
- Map showing the results of the 2007 Chichester District Council elections by ward.
Council control before election
Conservative
Council control after election
Conservative

Elections to Chichester District Council in West Sussex, United Kingdom were held on 3 May 2007. The whole council was up for election and the Conservative Party held overall control with an increased majority.

== Election result ==
Chichester District Council Election Result 2007
Party	Seats	Gains	Losses	Net gain/loss	Seats %	Votes %	Votes	+/−
Conservative	34	11	3	+8	70.8	52.9	32,611	+8.4
Liberal Democrats	11	1	10	-9	22.9	32.5	20,005	-5.5
Independent	3	2	1	+1	6.2	9.5	5,850	+7.2
Labour	0	0	0	0	0	2.6	1,595	-6.6
UKIP	0	0	0	0	0	2.2	1,336	-2.6
BNP	0	0	0	0	0	0.4	247	+0.4

1 Conservative candidate was unopposed.

The +/- in seats is calculated after any by-election results since the last full council election. The +/- in vote % is calculated from the % at the last full council election.

↓
34	11	3
Conservative	Liberal Democrat	I.

== Ward results ==
Bosham (2 seats)
Party	Candidate	Votes	%	±%
Conservative	David John Myers	848	33.4	
Conservative	Myles Antony Cullen	846	33.4	
Independent	Cliff Archer	628	24.8	
UKIP	Alicia Ruth Denny	113	4.5	
UKIP	Douglas Denny	101	4.0	
Turnout		1471	43.2	
Conservative hold		Swing		
Conservative hold		Swing		

Boxgrove (1 seat)
Party	Candidate	Votes	%	±%
Conservative	Henry Potter	559	68.3	
Liberal Democrats	Jake Wright	260	31.8	
Turnout		819	47.4	
Conservative gain from Liberal Democrats		Swing		

Bury (1 seat)
Party	Candidate	Votes	%	±%
Conservative	Susan Eileen Wade-Weeks	439	55.3	
Independent	Susan Mary Hallock	355	44.7	
Turnout		794	44.6	
Conservative hold		Swing		

Chichester East (3 seats)
Party	Candidate	Votes	%	±%
Liberal Democrats	Quentin Robson Cox	777	19.4	
Liberal Democrats	Anthony John French	768	19.2	
Liberal Democrats	Susan Fairley	754	18.8	
Conservative	Hilary Anne Flynn	541	13.5	
Conservative	Paul Newton-Lewis	541	13.5	
Conservative	Robert Pettigrew	422	10.5	
Labour	June Mary Leonard	208	5.2	
Turnout		1555	26.8	
Liberal Democrats hold		Swing		
Liberal Democrats hold		Swing		
Liberal Democrats hold		Swing		

Chichester North (3 seats)
Party	Candidate	Votes	%	±%
Conservative	Derek Charles James	1055	17.2	
Conservative	Stuart Ian King	1006	16.4	
Conservative	Nicholas Roberts	969	15.8	
Liberal Democrats	Patricia Hooley	940	15.3	
Liberal Democrats	Richard Edward Plowman	925	15.0	
Liberal Democrats	Edith Pingree	891	14.5	
UKIP	Michael Mason	191	3.1	
Labour	Janet Cynthia Miller	173	2.8	
Turnout		2155	47.1	
Conservative gain from Liberal Democrats		Swing		
Conservative gain from Liberal Democrats		Swing		
Conservative gain from Liberal Democrats		Swing		

Chichester South (3 seats)
Party	Candidate	Votes	%	±%
Liberal Democrats	Anne Mary Dorothy Scicluna	812	17.4	
Conservative	Pam Dignum	725	15.6	
Liberal Democrats	Alan David Chaplin	690	14.8	
Liberal Democrats	David John Siggs	687	14.7	
Conservative	Barbara Joan Rees	663	14.2	
Conservative	Estelle Flora Strong	651	14.0	
UKIP	Nigel Degge Wilmot Sitwell	232	5.0	
Labour	Malcolm John Few	199	4.3	
Turnout		1696	33.9	
Liberal Democrats hold		Swing		
Conservative gain from Liberal Democrats		Swing		
Liberal Democrats hold		Swing		

Chichester West (2 seats)
Party	Candidate	Votes	%	±%
Liberal Democrats	Michael Raymond Shone	649	22.4	
Liberal Democrats	Clare Margaret Apel	646	22.2	
Conservative	Martyn John Bell	554	19.1	
Conservative	Margaret Whitehead	509	17.5	
BNP	Andrew Emerson	137	4.7	
BNP	Ray Lewis Fallick	110	3.8	
Labour	John Baker	102	3.5	
Labour	Catherine Mair Beach	102	3.5	
UKIP	James McCulloch	96	3.3	
Turnout		1507	39.6	
Liberal Democrats hold		Swing		
Liberal Democrats hold		Swing		

Donnington (1 seat)
Party	Candidate	Votes	%	±%
Conservative	John Ridd	528	67.4	
Liberal Democrats	Alan George Wells	256	32.7	
Turnout		784	43.6	
Conservative hold		Swing		

Easebourne (1 seat)
Party	Candidate	Votes	%	±%
Conservative	Elizabeth Hamilton	576	78.8	
Liberal Democrats	Arely Green	159	21.6	
Turnout		735	39.0	
Conservative gain from Liberal Democrats		Swing		

East Wittering (2 seats)
Party	Candidate	Votes	%	±%
Conservative	Sevey Mastronardi	575	21.6	
Conservative	Peter Clementson	574	21.6	
Independent	Bob Norris	517	19.4	
Liberal Democrats	Mary Ellen Green	491	18.5	
Liberal Democrats	Simon Green	381	14.3	
Labour	Patrick Joseph O'Sullivan	122	4.6	
Turnout		1531	38.1	
Conservative hold		Swing		
Conservative gain from Independent		Swing		

Fernhurst (2 seats)
Party	Candidate	Votes	%	±%
Conservative	Heather Penelope Caird	997	34.3	
Conservative	Norma Graves	645	22.2	
Independent	Andrew Moncrieff	557	19.2	
Liberal Democrats	Jeremy Spencer Bonnett	362	12.5	
Liberal Democrats	David Dennis Martin-Jenkins	347	11.9	
Turnout		1568	40.3	
Conservative hold		Swing		
Conservative gain from Liberal Democrats		Swing		

Fishbourne (1 seat)
Party	Candidate	Votes	%	±%
Liberal Democrats	Adrian Geoffrey Frank Moss	674	73.0	
Conservative	Ann Myers	249	27.0	
Turnout		923	51.9	
Liberal Democrats hold		Swing		

Funtington (1 seat)
Party	Candidate	Votes	%	±%
Conservative	Julie Tassell	726	76.4	
Liberal Democrats	John Cooper Rankin	224	24.0	
Turnout		950	44.4	
Conservative hold		Swing		

Harting (1 seat)
Party	Candidate	Votes	%	±%
Independent	Andrew Michael Shaxson	609	72.4	
Conservative	Sarah Elizabeth Baker	232	28.0	
Turnout		841	49.7	
Independent hold		Swing		

Lavant (1 seat)
Party	Candidate	Votes	%	±%
Liberal Democrats	Andrew Robert Homan Smith	362	59.7	
Conservative	John Elliott	244	40.3	
Turnout		606	36.6	
Liberal Democrats hold		Swing		

Midhurst (2 seats)
Party	Candidate	Votes	%	±%
Conservative	Nick Thomas	805	30.4	
Conservative	Brian John Weekes	799	30.2	
Liberal Democrats	Judith Russell Fowler	565	21.4	
Liberal Democrats	Lavinia Mary Harvey	477	18.0	
Turnout		1376	34.9	
Conservative hold		Swing		
Conservative hold		Swing		

North Mundham (1 seat)
Party	Candidate	Votes	%	±%
Liberal Democrats	Stephen Quigley	436	62.1	
Conservative	Jane Kilby	266	37.9	
Turnout		702	41.3	
Liberal Democrats hold		Swing		

Petworth (2 seats)
Party	Candidate	Votes	%	±%
Conservative	Janet Elizabeth Duncton	1053	39.1	
Conservative	Eileen Lintill	952	35.3	
Liberal Democrats	Liz Jenkins	373	13.8	
Liberal Democrats	Catherine Gillian Alderson Perschke	318	11.8	
Turnout		1446	38.2	
Conservative hold		Swing		
Conservative hold		Swing		

Plaistow (2 seats)
Party	Candidate	Votes	%	±%
Conservative	Brian James Hooton	1026	39.8	
Conservative	Paul Mackey	977	37.9	
Liberal Democrats	Karen Elizabeth Bonnett	288	11.2	
Liberal Democrats	Raymond Ernest John Cooper	287	11.1	
Turnout		1364	36.8	
Conservative hold		Swing		
Conservative hold		Swing		

Rogate (1 seat)
Party	Candidate	Votes	%	±%
Conservative	William Ernest Delacour Mason	695	73.2	
Liberal Democrats	Kevin George Campbell	255	26.8	
Turnout		950	47.4	
Conservative hold		Swing		

Selsey North (3 seats)
Party	Candidate	Votes	%	±%
Conservative	Melva Kathleen Bateman	880	15.8	
Conservative	John Charles Patrick Connor	835	15.0	
Conservative	Bev Tinson	796	14.3	
Independent	Kenneth Frederick George Codd	554	9.9	
Independent	Dee Caldwell	496	8.9	
Independent	Linda Irene Bowman	494	8.9	
Liberal Democrats	Jacq Cook	376	6.7	
Liberal Democrats	Jane-Marie McQueen	300	5.4	
Liberal Democrats	Libby Kendall	274	4.9	
UKIP	Andrew Edward Wilkinson	174	3.1	
Labour	Margaret Dyer	147	2.6	
Labour	Sidney William Arthur Hoy	134	2.4	
Labour	Micheline Margaret Lawson	121	2.2	
Turnout		1989	38.2	
Conservative hold		Swing		
Conservative hold		Swing		
Conservative gain from Liberal Democrats		Swing		

Selsey South (2 seats)
Party	Candidate	Votes	%	±%
Independent	Fred Robertson	617	21.7	
Independent	Roland O'Brien	541	19.0	
Conservative	Albert Edward Vines	538	18.9	
Conservative	John Thomas Curtis	531	18.7	
UKIP	Bernard Arthur Smith	178	6.3	
Liberal Democrats	Jenny Graves	162	5.7	
Liberal Democrats	John Edward Shade	114	4.0	
Labour	Ian Bell	88	3.1	
Labour	Wendy Virginia Pengelly	72	2.5	
Turnout		1484	41.3	
Independent gain from Conservative		Swing		
Independent gain from Conservative		Swing		

Sidlesham (1 seat)
Party	Candidate	Votes	%	±%
Conservative	Patricia Mary Tull	393	53.8	
Liberal Democrats	Diana Joy Pound	338	46.2	
Turnout		731	40.0	
Conservative gain from Liberal Democrats		Swing		

Southbourne (3 seats)
Party	Candidate	Votes	%	±%
Conservative	Graham Hamilton Hicks	970	18.6	
Conservative	Robert James Hayes	961	18.4	
Conservative	Mary Marrs	913	17.5	
Liberal Democrats	Barbara Gowlett	828	15.9	
Liberal Democrats	Roger Gowlett	827	15.9	
Liberal Democrats	Philip Charles MacDougall	716	13.7	
Turnout		1862	33.8	
Conservative hold		Swing		
Conservative gain from Liberal Democrats		Swing		
Conservative hold		Swing		

Stedham (1 seat)
Party	Candidate	Votes	%	±%
Conservative	John Lorraine Cherry	659	80.3	
Liberal Democrats	Teresa Eleanor Campbell	162	19.7	
Turnout		821	45.2	
Conservative hold		Swing		

Tangmere (1 seat)
Party	Candidate	Votes	%	±%
Liberal Democrats	Chris Punnett	335	51.4	
Conservative	Brenda Atlee	317	48.6	
Turnout		652	36.4	
Liberal Democrats gain from Conservative		Swing		

Westbourne (1 seat)
Party	Candidate	Votes	%	±%
Conservative	Maureen Eleanor Elliott	445	72.1	
Liberal Democrats	Stephanie Myra Cecil	172	27.9	
Turnout		617	36.4	
Conservative hold		Swing		

West Wittering (2 seats)
Party	Candidate	Votes	%	±%
Conservative	Pieter Montyn	1096	32.9	
Conservative	Peter Edward Jones	1030	30.9	
Independent	David Hopson	482	14.5	
Liberal Democrats	Roger Walter Tilbury	347	10.4	
UKIP	Roger Lewis Wilson	251	7.5	
Labour	Gordon Trevor Churchill	127	3.8	
Turnout		1823	45.6	
Conservative hold		Swing		
Conservative hold		Swing		

Wisborough Green (1 seat)
Party	Candidate	Votes	%	±%
Conservative	Robert Harry Field (Re-elected Unopposed)	n/a	n/a	
Conservative hold		Swing		

== By-Election results ==
See Chichester local elections for by-election results since this Council election.
