= 2011 Chichester District Council election =

2011 UK local government election

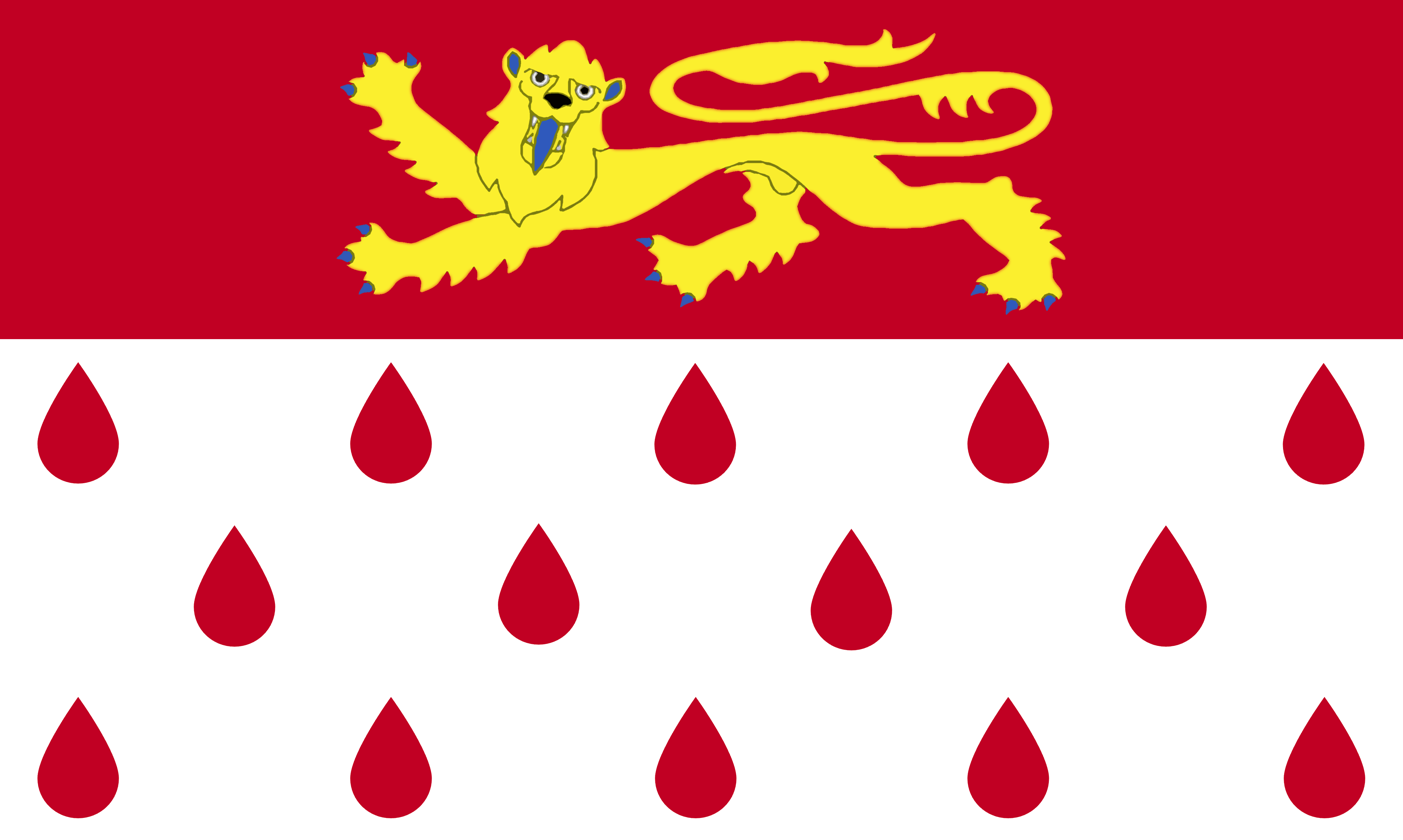
← 2007	5 May 2011	2015 →

All 48 seats to Chichester District Council 25 seats needed for a majority
	First party	Second party
Party	Conservative	Liberal Democrats
Last election	34	11
Seats won	38	8
Seat change	▲4	▼3
Popular vote	21,900	9,779
Percentage	53.2%	23.8%
- Map showing the results of the 2011 Chichester District Council elections by ward.
Council control before election
Conservative
Council control after election
Conservative

The 2011 Chichester District Council election took place on 5 May 2011 to elect members of Chichester District Council in England. This was on the same day as other local elections.
