= Fishbourn (surname) =

Fischbach is an English-origin surname. Notable people with the surname include:

- Benjamin Fishbourn (1759-1790), politician and Continental soldier during the American Revolution
- William Fishbourn (1677-1744), mayor of Philadelphia
