= A. J. Mills (politician) =

American politician (1841–1925)

Member of the Washington House of Representatives from the 22nd district
- In office 1895–1897 Serving with M. S. Fishburn

Member of the Dakota Territorial Legislature
- In office 1870–1872

Personal details
- Born: Andrew Jackson Mills; May 8, 1841 Lake County, Illinois, U.S.
- Died: December 25, 1925 (aged 84) Lake Shore, Washington, U.S.
- Resting place: Vancouver Masonic Cemetery
- Party: Republican
- Spouse: Maria McCollom (m. 1866)
- Children: 5
- Occupation: Politician; farmer

Andrew Jackson Mills (May 8, 1841 – December 25, 1925) was an American politician and farmer from Dakota Territory and Washington. He served in the Dakota Territorial Legislature from 1870 to 1872 and served in the Washington House of Representatives from 1895 to 1897.

== Early life ==
Andrew Jackson Mills was born on May 8, 1841, on a farm in Lake County, Illinois. He attended a village school until the age of 17. He then attended a school in Chicago until the American Civil War broke out.

== Career ==
At the outbreak of the Civil War, Mills enlisted in company A of the 52nd regiment of the Illinois Cavalry. He was captured by the forces of General Nathan Bedford Forrest. He was imprisoned in Andersonville Prison. He was later paroled to Benson Barracks and exchanged. He re-enlisted in the 8th regiment of Hancock's Veterans Corps. He served until he mustered out on April 1, 1865, in Washington, D.C. From 1865 to 1868, he worked in real estate in Chicago. From the fall of 1868 to 1880, he raised livestock and farmed in the Dakota Territory. He was elected to the Dakota Territorial Legislature in 1869, re-elected in 1871, and served as the legislature's speaker in 1872. In 1875, he was elected to the Territorial Council. He was appointed to a position in the Dakota Penitentiary in Sioux Falls and was later appointed as deputy warden. He worked at the penitentiary for six years until spring 1888.

Mills moved to Clark County, Washington, in November 1888. He worked as a fruit farmer. He became a member of the county council of the Patrons of Husbandry. He was a Republican and served as a member of the Washington House of Representatives, representing district 17, from 1895 to 1897, alongside M. S. Fishburn. He helped erect the school building in Lake Shore and plant the maple trees around it.

== Personal life ==
Mills married Maria McCollom on November 22, 1866. They had three sons and two daughters, G. M., Chapin A., Marion F., Alma, and Mrs. J. J. Stoddard. Mills and his wife lived in Chicago from 1866 to 1869 and then they moved to Sioux Falls. He was a member of Ellsworth Post No. 2 of the Grand Army of the Republic. He was a member of Washington Lodge No. 4, the Free and Accepted Masons, Martha Washington Chapter No. 42 of the Order of the Eastern Star, and the Lake Shore Grange.

Mills fell off the steps of the Vancouver Public Library striking the cement sidewalk in December 1925. He died the following week on December 25, 1925, at his home in Lake Shore. He was buried in Vancouver Masonic Cemetery.
