= Fishburn =

Coordinates: 54.683°N 1.436°W

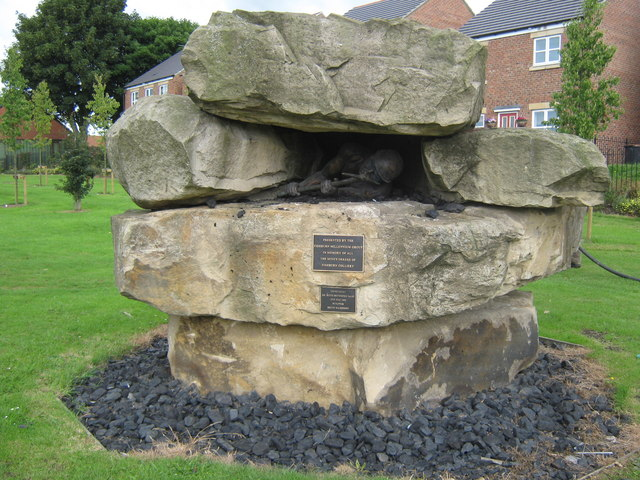
- Fishburn Miners Memorial

- Location within County Durham
- Population: 2,588 (2011)
- OS grid reference: NZ364321
- Civil parish: Fishburn
- Unitary authority: County Durham
- Ceremonial county: County Durham
- Region: North East
- Country: England
- Sovereign state: United Kingdom
- Post town: STOCKTON-ON-TEES
- Postcode district: TS21
- Dialling code: 01740
- Police: Durham
- Fire: County Durham and Darlington
- Ambulance: North East
- UK Parliament: Sedgefield

Fishburn is a village and civil parish in County Durham, in England. It is situated about 12 miles (19 km) west of Hartlepool. The population was 2,454, increasing to 2,588 at the 2011 Census.

== Location ==
The village lies scattered along a dry swell of magnesian limestone rising north from the River Skerne (known locally as the "beck") to approximately 500 feet (150 m) above sea level. The beck is one of the parish boundaries, as the township of Sedgefield begins on the other side of the river.

== History ==
The earliest proprietors of the village (and then manor) on record were the family of "Fissebourne." There are a number of theories on how the village got its name. In one book, it is stated that the name derives from the Saxon words "Fisc," meaning fish, and "Bourne," meaning brook. Another theory is that it was derived from the monks who used to fish at this spot in the early days; hence "fish in the burn," Fishburn. However, it is more likely that the family of Fissebourne gave its name to the manor. It may also be a Flemish name associated with the Norman Conquerors, i.e., Ranulf de Fishbourne. Historical maps suggest that the village was named "Fissebourne" at one time, and then, some considerable years later, it became "Fishbourne," later adopting its present name, "Fishburn."

== Coal mining ==
Between 1910 and 1973, coal mining was a major industry, with the number of employees at Fishburn Colliery peaking at over 1500 in the 1950s.

The Fishburn Coking Plant was built in 1954 alongside the colliery to produce high-grade coke for industry and a domestic coke called Sunbrite, as well as other byproducts from the coking process, such as town gas which was supplied directly to the nearby Winterton Hospital and to the national grid.

After much uncertainty about its future, and with attempts by the then MP Tony Blair to save it, the plant was eventually closed in 1986, resulting in the loss of 250 jobs. Today, nothing remains of the former ovens, and the site has been reclaimed as a nature reserve.

== Culture ==
Fishburn is home to the Fishburn Brass Band, which was started by local miners as the Fishburn Colliery Welfare Band in the 1950s. The band has won several high-profile contests, including the Scottish Open Champions in 2005 and the Durham County Brass Band League. The band also plays on the streets of Fishburn on the day of the Durham Miners Gala and at Christmas playing traditional Christmas carols.

Fishburn appeared in the BBC TV genealogy series Who Do You Think You Are? featuring Tamzin Outhwaite, whose great-grandfather owned an ice cream shop on Chaytor Terrace.

== Transport ==
Fishburn Airfield is a 600-by-30-metre (2,000 ft × 100 ft) grass strip runway catering for private flyers with light aircraft. The airfield hosted filming for a scene from the Bollywood film Hari Puttar: A Comedy of Terrors

== Site of Special Scientific Interest ==
Fishburn Grasslands is an area north of the village. It has been designated a Site of Special Scientific Interest as the underlying Magesian Limestone provides a habitat for rare species of plant life.

== Notable people ==
- Colin Cooper - Footballer and manager
- Bert Draycott - World Champion Spoons Player
- Mike Hooper - Footballer
- Micky Horswill - Footballer
- David James Llewellyn - Broadcaster
- Irving Nattrass - Newcastle United Midfielder
- Lewis Bowden - Podcaster
- Mike Peacock - Footballer
- Niall Quinn - Footballer
- Paul Ward - Footballer
