= Fishburn (1799 ship) =

British merchant ship 1799–1803

History

Great Britain
- Name: Fishburn
- Laid down: Sunderland
- Launched: 1799
- Fate: Wrecked 19 February 1803

General characteristics
- Tons burthen: 360 (bm)
- Armament: 8 × 6-pounder guns + 8 × 12-pounder carronades

Fishburn was launched at Sunderland in 1799. She originally traded between England and Riga, where the Russian government seized her in 1800. The seizure gave rise to two court cases, one concerning a crewmember's claim for wages during her detention and one arising out of her owner's sale of Fishburn during the detention. New owners changed her trade to Liverpool–Honduras or Yucatan. She was wrecked in 1803 while sailing from Honduras back to London.

== Career ==
Fishburn first appeared in Lloyd's Register for 1800 with W. Simmons, master, changing to Ward, Ward, owner, and trade London–Riga.

Emperor Paul I of Russia, in the context of the Second League of Armed Neutrality and the British Mediterranean campaign of 1798, on 18 November 1800 placed an embargo on all British shipping to Russia. The Russians seized some 200 British vessels in Russian ports, imprisoned some 4000–5000 crewmembers, and sequestrated some £1,500,000 in British property. The embargo lasted until 28 May 1801, some two months after Paul's assassination in March 1801. The embargo interrupted the grain trade with the Baltic at a time when Britain was in the grips of weather-induced crop failures. The bread shortage precipitated the British government's decision in November 1800 to send a naval force to the Baltic once ice and weather conditions permitted. It also led the government to have the British East India Company (EIC) charter 28 vessels, comprising 14,785 tons (bm), to sail from England between December 1800 and February 1801 to bring back rice from Bengal.

Fishburn sailed before the announcement of the Russian embargo 18 November and on her arrival on 29 November the Russian government seized her. Her crew were taken prisoner and marched 150 miles up country, together with the crews of other British vessels. After six months they returned to Fishburn, reloaded her cargo, and sailed her back to Plymouth, where she arrived on 10 August 1801. A seaman on Fishburn, John Andrew Fisher, sued for £40 for back wages for the period of his detention. The jury on the first and second trials awarded him the sum. A judge in a subsequent hearing upheld the prior verdicts. There was also a case arising out of Ward's sale of Fishburn to Hubbard on 9 November 1801, and Hubbard having sold the vessel on 19 February 1802 to T. Brown, R. Brown, and T. Old on 9 November 1801, Ward having earlier sold one-third of the ship to the plaintiff Heath. The court found for Heath, the plaintiff, and ordered Hubbard to repay Heath his one-third part.

Lloyd's Register for 1802 showed Fishburn's master changing from A(braham) Ward to Leek, her owner changing from T(homas) Ward to C. Brown, and her trade from London–Riga to London–Yucatan. On 6 August 1802 Fishburn, Leake, master, sailed from Gravesend for Yucatan.

== Loss ==
Fishburn, Leake, master, was lost on 19 February 1803 on the coast of Honduras a day after leaving for London.
