= Fishburn Grassland =

Protected area in County Durham, England

- Location within County Durham
- Location: MAGiC MaP
- Nearest town: Sedgefield
- Coordinates: 54°41′22″N 1°26′21″W
- Area: 1.12 ha (2.8 acres)
- Established: 1992
- Governing body: Natural England
- Website: Fishburn Grassland SSSI

Fishburn Grassland is a Site of Special Scientific Interest in County Durham, England. It lies between the villages of Fishburn and Trimdon, just north of the former.

The site consists of a small area of species-rich magnesian limestone grassland, a vegetation type that is rare nationally and mainly restricted to County Durham and Tyne and Wear. There are two distinct plant communities, the larger of which, dominated by blue moor-grass, Sesleria albicans, and small scabious, Scabiosa columbaria, is known only from east Durham. The other community, dominated by upright brome, Bromus erectus, is common on limestone in southern England but is at its northern limit in Durham, where there are no other protected sites.
