= Andrew Mills (English footballer) =

English footballer

Personal information
- Full name: Andrew Robert Mills
- Date of birth: 12 December 1993 (age 32)
- Place of birth: Huyton, England
- Height: 1.95 m (6 ft 5 in)
- Position: Goalkeeper

Team information
- Current team: Glentoran
- Number: 1

Youth career
- –2012: Macclesfield Town

Senior career*
| Years | Team | Apps | (Gls) |
| 2012–2014 | Macclesfield Town | 0 | (0) |
| 2012 | → New Mills (loan) | 18 | (0) |
| 2013 | → Buxton (loan) | 11 | (0) |
| 2013 | → Cammell Laird (loan) | 16 | (0) |
| 2013 | → Salford City (loan) | 12 | (0) |
| 2013 | → Newcastle Town (loan) | 5 | (0) |
| 2014 | Woking | 2 | (0) |
| 2014 | Arnäs IF | 28 | (0) |
| 2015–2016 | Friska Viljor | 47 | (0) |
| 2017 | IFK Östersund | 24 | (0) |
| 2017 | → Östersund (loan) | 0 | (0) |
| 2018–2020 | Östersund | 1 | (0) |
| 2021–2024 | Östersund | 28 | (0) |
| 2024– | Glentoran | 39 | (0) |
- * Club domestic league appearances and goals as of 29 April 2026

Andrew Robert Mills (born 12 December 1993) is an English professional footballer who plays as a goalkeeper for Glentoran.

== Career ==
After being released by Macclesfield Town in 2014, Mills joined Swedish sixth-tier side Arnäs IF. He then had spells playing for Division 3 side Friska Viljor and Division 2 side IFK Östersund. In July 2017, he joined Allsvenskan side Östersund on loan before making the deal permanent the following year. On 18 October 2020, he made his professional league debut, starting in a 3–2 win over Sirius. On 11 October 2021, Mills rejoined Östersund after a spell back in the UK. In July 2024, Mills joined NIFL Premiership side Glentoran. On 19 January 2025, he signed a new 18-month contract with the club. Two days later, Mills was part of the squad which lifted the County Antrim Shield, saving a penalty in the shootout.

== Honours ==
Glentoran

- County Antrim Shield: 2024–25
