= Fishburn (ship) =

Several ships have been named Fishburn:

== Fishburn (1753 ship) ==
- Fishburn, of 170 tons (bm), was launched in 1753. In January 1755, she brought troops from Ireland to Virginia to participate in General Braddock's disastrous expedition against the French-occupied Ohio River Valley shortly thereafter. In 1762, Fishburn was at Norfolk. Between six and 24 enslaved people and six white men worked for three weeks at the same wages to unload her.

== Fishburn (1780 ship) ==
- Fishburn (1780 ship) was built at Whitby. She was the largest of the three storeships of the First Fleet to Australia. She disappears from readily accessible online records in 1789, after her return from Botany Bay.

== Fishburn (1799 ship) ==
- Fishburn (1799 ship) was launched at Sunderland. She was arrested at Riga in 1800 under the Russian embargo on British shipping. After her release new owners sailed her between London and Honduras; she was lost in February 1803 after sailing from Honduras.

== Fishburn 1846 ship) ==
- Fishburn, of 176 tons (bm), was launched at Sunderland in 1846. She was wrecked in 1847.
