= M. S. Fishburn =

American politician

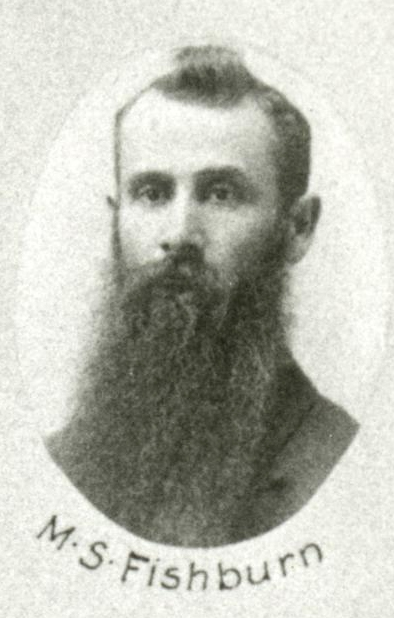
- Fishburn in 1895

Member of the Washington House of Representatives for the 22nd district
- In office 1895–1897

Personal details
- Born: March 18, 1844 Van Buren County, Iowa, United States
- Died: December 22, 1926 (aged 82) Portland, Oregon, United States
- Party: Republican

Martin Stiles Fishburn (March 18, 1844 – December 22, 1926) was an American politician in the state of Washington. He served in the Washington House of Representatives from 1895 to 1897.
