= 2015 Chichester District Council election =

2015 UK local government election

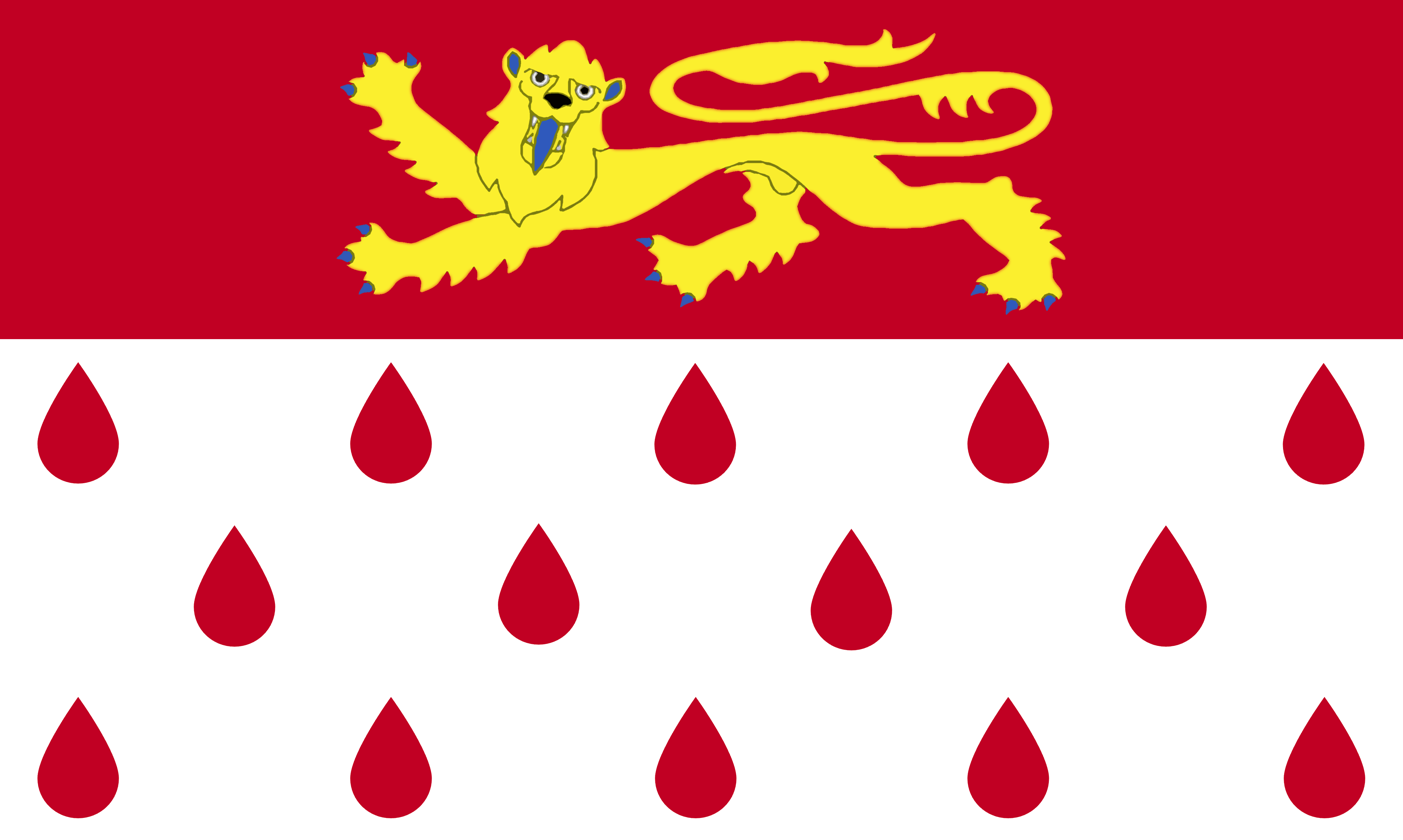
- 7 May 2015

All 48 seats to Chichester District Council 25 seats needed for a majority
| | First party | Second party | Third party |
|---|---|---|---|
| Party | Conservative | Liberal Democrats | Independent |
| Last election | 38 | 8 | 2 |
| Seats won | 42 | 3 | 3 |
| Seat change | ▲4 | ▼5 | ▲1 |
| Popular vote | 29,361 | 10,547 | 4,438 |
| Percentage | 51.6% | 18.5% | 7.8% |
- Map showing the results of the 2015 Chichester District Council elections by ward.
Council control before election
Conservative
Council control after election
Conservative

The 2015 Chichester District Council election took place on 7 May 2015 to elect members of Chichester District Council in England. This was on the same day as other local elections.
