= Exeter City Council elections =

Local government elections in Devon, England

Exeter City Council is the local authority for Exeter in Devon, England. One third of the council is elected each year, followed by one year without election.

== Election results ==
Composition of the council
Year	Conservative	Labour	Liberal Democrats (Note: Includes totals for the predecessors of the Liberal Democrats, the Liberal Party and SDP (both of which participated in the Alliance).)	Reform	Green (Note: Includes totals for the predecessors of the Green Party of England and Wales, the Ecology Party and Green Party UK.)	Liberal	Independents & Others	Council control after election
Local government reorganisation; council established (34 seats)
1973	14	13	6	–	–	–	1	No overall control
1976	24	9	1	–	0	–	0	Conservative
1979	22	8	2	–	0	–	2	Conservative
New ward boundaries (36 seats)
1983	21	10	4	–	0	–	1	Conservative
1984	16	14	5	–	0	–	1	No overall control
1986	14	15	6	–	0	–	1	No overall control
1987	15	13	7	–	0	–	1	No overall control
1988	15	13	7	–	0	–	1	No overall control
1990	13	15	7	–	0	0	1	No overall control
1991	11	18	6	–	0	1	0	No overall control
1992	14	16	5	–	0	1	0	No overall control
1994	12	16	6	–	0	2	0	No overall control
1995	9	19	6	–	0	2	0	Labour
1996	2	24	7	–	0	3	0	Labour
1998	3	22	8	–	0	3	0	Labour
1999	3	22	8	–	0	3	0	Labour
New ward boundaries (40 seats)
2000	6	25	5	–	0	4	0	Labour
2002	6	22	8	–	0	4	0	Labour
2003	6	20	10	–	0	4	0	No overall control
2004	5	19	12	–	0	4	0	No overall control
2006	8	16	12	–	0	4	0	No overall control
2007	10	14	12	–	0	4	0	No overall control
2008	12	11	13	–	0	4	0	No overall control
2010 (Note: By-elections in the 12 wards were held in September 2010 following a High Court ruling)	12	11	13	–	0	4	0	No overall control
2011	11	19	9	–	0	1	0	No overall control
2012	11	24	5	–	0	0	0	Labour
2014	10	27	3	–	0	0	0	Labour
2015	10	29	1	–	0	0	0	Labour
New ward boundaries (39 seats)
2016	8	30	1	–	0	0	0	Labour
2018	8	29	1	–	1	0	0	Labour
2019	6	29	2	–	1	0	1	Labour
2021	6	28	2	0	2	0	1	Labour
2022	5	26	2	0	5	0	1	Labour
2023	4	25	3	0	6	0	1	Labour
2024	3	24	4	0	7	0	1	Labour
2026	1	18	5	3	10	0	2	No overall control

== Council elections ==
- 1973 Exeter City Council election
- 1976 Exeter City Council election
- 1979 Exeter City Council election
- 1983 Exeter City Council election (New ward boundaries)
- 1984 Exeter City Council election
- 1986 Exeter City Council election
- 1987 Exeter City Council election
- 1988 Exeter City Council election (City boundary changes took place but the number of seats remained the same)
- 1990 Exeter City Council election
- 1991 Exeter City Council election
- 1992 Exeter City Council election
- 1994 Exeter City Council election
- 1995 Exeter City Council election
- 1996 Exeter City Council election
- 1998 Exeter City Council election
- 1999 Exeter City Council election
- 2000 Exeter City Council election (New ward boundaries)
- 2002 Exeter City Council election
- 2003 Exeter City Council election
- 2004 Exeter City Council election
- 2006 Exeter City Council election
- 2007 Exeter City Council election
- 2008 Exeter City Council election
- 2010 Exeter City Council election (By-elections in 12 wards were held in September following a High Court ruling)
- 2011 Exeter City Council election
- 2012 Exeter City Council election
- 2014 Exeter City Council election
- 2015 Exeter City Council election
- 2016 Exeter City Council election (New ward boundaries)
- 2018 Exeter City Council election
- 2019 Exeter City Council election
- 2021 Exeter City Council election
- 2022 Exeter City Council election
- 2023 Exeter City Council election
- 2024 Exeter City Council election
- 2026 Exeter City Council election

== Result maps ==
2000 results map

2002 results map

2003 results map

2004 results map

2006 results map

2007 results map

2008 results map

2010 results map

2011 results map

2012 results map

2014 results map

2015 results map

2016 results map

2018 results map

2019 results map

2021 results map

2022 results map

2023 results map

2024 results map

2026 results map

== By-election results ==
=== 2000–2004 ===
Duryard By-Election 26 February 2004
Party	Candidate	Votes	%	±%
Liberal Democrats	Sheila Hobden	504	47.1	−0.5
Conservative	Graham Stone	392	36.7	+4.0
Labour	Dominic O'Brien	93	8.7	−2.1
Green	Isaac Price-Sosner	80	7.5	−1.4
Majority		112	10.4	
Turnout		1,069	25.5	
Liberal Democrats hold		Swing		

=== 2004–2008 ===
St James By-Election 5 May 2005
Party	Candidate	Votes	%	±%
Liberal Democrats	Natalie Cole	1,171	39.6	+11.5
Labour	John Poat	746	25.3	−10.1
Conservative	Simon Smith	648	21.9	−0.8
Green	Isaac Price-Sosner	389	13.2	+0.9
Majority		425	14.3	
Turnout		2,954	60.9	
Liberal Democrats gain from Labour		Swing		

Alphington By-Election 13 July 2006
Party	Candidate	Votes	%	±%
Liberal Democrats	Alexandra Newcombe	890	45.4	−9.1
Conservative	Margaret Jordan	703	35.8	+8.0
Labour	Paul Bull	227	11.6	−6.0
Green	Andrew Bell	142	7.2	+7.2
Majority		187	9.6	
Turnout		1,962	30.4	
Liberal Democrats hold		Swing		

=== 2008–2012 ===
Pennsylvania By-Election 6 May 2010
Party	Candidate	Votes	%	±%
Liberal Democrats	Timothy Payne	1,391		
Conservative	David Thompson	913		
Labour	Bernard Dugdale	491		
UKIP	David Smith	152		
Green	Isaac Price-Sosner	88		
Majority				
Turnout		3,058	71.57%	
Liberal Democrats hold		Swing		

=== 2012–2016 ===
Pinhoe By-Election 13 August 2015
Party	Candidate	Votes	%	±%
Conservative	Cynthia Thompson	755		
Labour	David Harvey	749		
UKIP	Alison Sheridan	143		
Liberal Democrats	Michael Payne	63		
Green	John Moreman	62		
Independent	David Smith	11		
Majority				
Turnout		1,758	34.72%	
Conservative hold		Swing		

=== 2016–2021 ===
St Thomas By-Election 4 May 2017
Party	Candidate	Votes	%	±%
Labour	Heather Morris	1,376		
Liberal Democrats	Adrian Fullam	863		
Conservative	Alexandre Pierre-Traves	628		
Green	Joseph Levy	197		
UKIP	Alison Sheridan	73		
Majority				
Turnout		3,144	42.43%	
Labour hold		Swing		

Newtown and St Leonard's By-Election 13 December 2017
Party	Candidate	Votes	%	±%
Labour	Matthew Vizard	1,044	54.6	+5.0
Conservative	Lucille Baker	512	26.8	+3.3
Liberal Democrats	Alexandra Newcombe	179	9.4	+2.4
Green	Tom Milburn	137	7.2	−4.8
UKIP	Alison Sheridan	40	2.1	−2.8
Majority		532	27.8	
Turnout		1,912		
Labour hold		Swing		

Topsham By-Election 12 December 2019
Party	Candidate	Votes	%	±%
Conservative	Keith Sparkes	2,315	42.5%	−4.5%
Labour	Ivan Jordan	1,713	31%	+1.1%
Liberal Democrats	Christine Campion	1,106	20%	+14.7
For Britain	Frankie Rufolo	245	4.5%	+4.5%
Majority				
Turnout		5442	73.97%	
Conservative hold		Swing		

=== 2024–2028 ===
Mincinglake and Whipton By-Election 1 May 2025
Party	Candidate	Votes	%	±%
Reform	Tony Payne	789	34.8	+34.8
Labour Co-op	Paula Black	630	27.8	−10.7
Independent	Angela Martin	259	11.4	N/A
Green	Martin Ayres	251	11.1	+3.4
Conservative	Ian Anthony Baldwin	189	8.3	−5.0
Liberal Democrats	Paul Richards	147	6.5	+1.4
Majority		159	7.0	
Turnout		2,270	34.89	
Registered electors		6,505		
Reform gain from Labour		Swing		

Topsham By-Election 1 May 2025
Party	Candidate	Votes	%	±%
Labour	James Elie Cookson	933	28.3	−16.8
Conservative	Keith Andrew Sparkes	905	27.5	−9.3
Reform	Edward Clive Andrew Hill	760	23.1	+23.1
Liberal Democrats	Philip Alexander Thomas	349	10.6	+3.3
Green	Greg Wotton	339	10.3	−0.5
Majority		28	0.8	
Turnout		3,293	39.86	
Registered electors		8,262		
Labour hold		Swing		
