= 2022 Exeter City Council election =

2022 UK local government election

- 5 May 2022

17 out of 39 seats to Exeter City Council 20 seats needed for a majority

	First party	Second party	Third party
Party	Labour	Conservative	Green
Last election	28 seats, 44.4%	6 seats, 30.1%	2 seats, 15.7%
Seats before	28	6	2
Seats won	12	1	3
Seats after	26	5	5
Seat change	▼2	▼1	▲3
Popular vote	19,948	9,743	9,434
Percentage	45.8%	22.4%	21.7%
Swing	▲1.4%	▼7.7%	▲6.0%
	Fourth party	Fifth party
Party	Liberal Democrats	Independent
Last election	2 seats, 8.4%	1 seat, 0.6%
Seats before	2	1
Seats won	1	0
Seats after	2	1
Seat change	Steady	Steady
Popular vote	4,084	111
Percentage	9.4%	0.3%
Swing	▲1.0%	▼0.3%
- Winner of each seat at the 2022 Exeter City Council election
Council control before election
Labour
Council control after election
Labour

The 2022 Exeter City Council election took place on 5 May 2022 to elect members to Exeter City Council in Devon, England. This was the same day as other local elections in the United Kingdom. 17 of the 39 seats were up for election, one councillor in each of the 13 wards, and 4 by-elections. These wards were last contested in 2018.

== Council composition ==
The Labour Party have a majority of 17 on the council. The Conservatives are the main opposition with 6 councillors. The Liberal Democrat, Green and Independent Councillors formed a "Progressive Group" following the 2019 elections.

In these elections, 10 wards up for election currently have a Labour councillor (Alphington; Exwick; Heavitree; Mincinglake & Whipton; Newtown & St Leonards; Pennsylvania; Pinhoe; Priory; St Davids; and St Thomas), 2 have Conservative councillors (St Loyes; and Topsham) and 1 has a Liberal Democrat councillor (Duryard and St James).

In addition to these seats, four by-elections have so far been announced in the Exwick, Heavitree, Pennsylvania and Priory wards. In order to retain their overall majority on the councillor, Labour need to win at least six seats.

== Outgoing Councillors ==
Each ward has the following outgoing councillor:

=== Alphington ===
- Cllr. Bob Foale (Labour): Portfolio Holder for Transformation & Environment; First elected in 2016.

=== Duryard and St James ===
- Cllr. Kevin Mitchell (Liberal Democrat): Liberal Democrat group leader; Progressive Group leader; First elected in 2003.

=== Exwick ===
- Cllr. Rachel Sutton (Labour): Portfolio Holder for Net Zero Exeter 2030; First elected in 2010.
- A by-election will be held due to the resignation of Cllr. Ollie Pearson.

=== Heavitree ===
- Cllr. Greg Sheldon (Labour); First elected in 1996.
- A by-election will be held due to the resignation of Cllr. Chris Buswell.

=== Mincinglake and Whipton ===
- Cllr. Naima Allcock (Labour); First elected in 2021.

=== Newtown and St Leonards ===
- Cllr. Matthew Vizard (Labour); First elected in 2017.

=== Pennsylvania ===
- Cllr. Jane Begley (Labour); First elected in 2018.
- A by-election will be held due to the death of Cllr. Ian Quance.

=== Pinhoe ===
- Cllr. Duncan Wood (Labour); First elected in 2016.

=== Priory ===
- Cllr. Tony Wardle (Labour); First elected in 2008.
- A by-election will be held due to the resignation of Cllr. Alys Martin.

=== St Davids ===
- Cllr. Luke Sills (Labour); First elected in 2016.

=== St Loyes ===
- Cllr. Peter Holland (Conservative); First elected in 2014.

=== St Thomas ===
- Cllr. Laura Wright (Labour): Deputy Leader and Portfolio Holder for Council Housing Development and Services; First elected in 2018.

=== Topsham ===
- Cllr. Keith Sparkes (Conservative); First elected in 2019.

== Results summary ==
2022 Exeter City Council election
Party	This election				Full council			This election		
Party	Candidates	Seats	Net	Seats %	Other	Total	Total %	Votes	Votes %	+/−
Labour	{{{candidates}}}	12	▼2	73.7	14	26	66.7	19,948	45.8	+1.4
Conservative	{{{candidates}}}	1	▼1	5.3	4	5	12.8	9,743	22.4	-7.7
Green	{{{candidates}}}	3	▲3	15.8	2	5	12.8	9,434	21.7	+6.0
Liberal Democrats	{{{candidates}}}	1	Steady	5.3	1	2	5.1	4,084	9.4	+1.0
For Britain	{{{candidates}}}	0	Steady	0.0	0	0	0.0	252	0.6	+0.3
Independent	{{{candidates}}}	0	Steady	0.0	1	1	2.6	111	0.3	-0.3

== Ward results ==
The full list of candidates was published on 6th April. An asterisk (*) denotes an incumbent councillor seeking re-election.

Alphington
Party	Candidate	Votes	%	±%
Labour	Bob Foale*	1,190	50.0	+6.5
Conservative	John Harvey Benedict	727	30.6	−9.4
Green	Andrew Wallace Bell	265	11.1	−1.8
Liberal Democrats	Rod Ruffle	197	8.3	+0.9
Majority		463	19.4	+15.9
Turnout		2,379	37.4	−3.9
Rejected ballots		7		
Labour hold		Swing	+8.0	

Duryard and St James
Party	Candidate	Votes	%	±%
Liberal Democrats	Kevin John Mitchell*	995	42.7	+10.4
Labour	Sue Temple	791	34.0	−5.8
Conservative	Harry Johnson-Hill	333	14.3	−5.9
Green	Johanna Franziska Korndorfer	209	9.0	New
Majority		204	8.8	N/A
Turnout		2,328	31.7	−0.8
Rejected ballots		4		
Liberal Democrats hold		Swing	+8.1	

Exwick (2 Seats)
Party	Candidate	Votes	%	±%
Labour	Paul Graeme Knott	1,356	59.3	+8.7
Labour	Rachel Sutton*	1,208	52.7	N/A
Conservative	Henry Jonathan Geoffrey Clement-Jones	422	18.4	−12.9
Conservative	Kayleigh Michelle Suzanne Luscombe	402	17.5	N/A
Green	Mark Shorto	339	14.8	+0.9
Green	Alex Stephan	208	9.1	N/A
For Britain	Frankie Rufolo	192	8.4	N/A
Liberal Democrats	Joanne Giencke	174	7.6	+3.4
Liberal Democrats	Maya Skelton	109	4.8	N/A
Majority		786	34.3	+15.0
Turnout		2,291	31.6	−3.4
Rejected ballots		6		
Labour hold		Swing	+10.8	
Labour hold		Swing		

Heavitree (2 Seats)
Party	Candidate	Votes	%	±%
Green	Catherine Rees	1,436	44.7	6.2
Green	Carol Angela Bennett	1,418	44.2	N/A
Labour	Susannah Jane Patrick	1,211	37.7	−1.3
Labour	Greg Sheldon*	1,068	33.7	N/A
Conservative	Alfie Samuel Carlisle	419	13.1	−9.4
Conservative	Julian Maurice Gallie	383	11.9	N/A
Liberal Democrats	Philip John Brock	156	4.9	New
Liberal Democrats	Kris Mears	98	3.1	N/A
Majority		207	6.4	N/A
Turnout		3,210	47.4	+0.7
Rejected ballots		10		
Green gain from Labour		Swing	+3.8	
Green gain from Labour		Swing		

Mincinglake and Whipton
Party	Candidate	Votes	%	±%
Labour	Naima Jay Allcock*	1,246	61.8	+16.3
Conservative	Jack David Barwell	445	22.1	−7.2
Green	Lizzie Woodman	209	10.4	−6.0
Liberal Democrats	Michael Geoffrey Payne	116	5.8	−1.1
Majority		801	39.7	+5.3
Turnout		2,016	30.7	−3.7
Rejected ballots		11		
Labour hold		Swing	+11.8	

Newtown and St Leonard's
Party	Candidate	Votes	%	±%
Labour	Matthew James Vizard*	1,323	46.3	+1.6
Green	Andy Ketchin	1,159	40.6	−0.1
Conservative	Aric Samuel David Gillinsky	269	9.4	−5.2
Liberal Democrats	Lily Rosanna James	104	3.6	New
Majority		164	5.7	+1.7
Turnout		2,857	41.5	−0.7
Rejected ballots		16		
Labour hold		Swing	+0.9	

Pennsylvania (2 Seats)
Party	Candidate	Votes	%	±%
Labour	Josie Collette Miriam Parkhouse	1,400	48.3	−3.8
Labour	Martyn Ivor Snow	1,310	45.2	N/A
Green	Jack Stanley Eade	621	21.4	New
Green	Jack David Vickers	620	21.4	N/A
Conservative	Samuel Peter Michael Brooks	535	18.4	−9.8
Conservative	David William Moore	530	18.3	N/A
Liberal Democrats	Will Aczel	360	12.4	−7.3
Liberal Democrats	Nigel David Williams	288	9.9	N/A
Majority		689	23.8	−0.1
Turnout		2,901	38.7	−2.1
Rejected ballots		10		
Labour hold		Swing	N/A	
Labour hold		Swing		

Pinhoe
Party	Candidate	Votes	%	±%
Labour	Duncan Wood*	1,287	51.5	+2.5
Conservative	Cynthia Thompson	887	35.5	−1.1
Green	Caryl Thomas Eli Rowlinson	183	7.3	−1.6
Liberal Democrats	Christine Anne Campion	143	5.7	+0.2
Majority		400	16.0	+3.6
Turnout		2,500	35.9	−4.2
Rejected ballots		4		
Labour hold		Swing	+1.8	

Priory (2 Seats)
Party	Candidate	Votes	%	±%
Labour	Marina Yvette Asvachin	1,212	52.5	+2.4
Labour	Tony Wardle*	1,084	47.0	N/A
Conservative	Alison Jayne Sheridan	706	30.6	−3.1
Conservative	Ben Anthony Hawkes	701	30.4	N/A
Green	David Barker-Hahlo	317	13.7	+1.5
Green	Michael Anthony Kerr	258	11.2	N/A
Liberal Democrats	Philip Alexander Thomas	225	9.7	+5.2
Majority		378	16.4	−0.5
Turnout		2,308	34.9	−2.8
Rejected ballots		9		
Labour hold		Swing	+2.8	

St David's
Party	Candidate	Votes	%	±%
Green	Tess Read	1,251	47.9	+2.4
Labour	Jakir Hussain	919	35.2	−2.6
Conservative	Edward Michael John Barradell	328	12.6	−4.2
Liberal Democrats	Andrew Matthew Soper	114	4.4	New
Majority		332	12.7	+5.1
Turnout		2,612	36.5	−1.0
Rejected ballots		12		
Green gain from Labour		Swing	+2.5	

St Loye's
Party	Candidate	Votes	%	±%
Conservative	Peter Geoffrey Holland*	1,191	49.9	+3.3
Labour	Jane Margaret Frances Begley*	881	36.8	−1.1
Green	Ann Barbara Keen	326	13.6	+3.9
Majority		310	12.9	+4.2
Turnout		2,397	34.7	−3.3
Rejected ballots		16		
Conservative hold		Swing	+2.2	

Jane Begley was an incumbent councillor for the Pennsylvania ward.

St Thomas
Party	Candidate	Votes	%	±%
Labour	Laura Charis Adelaide Wright*	1,049	38.4	−8.4
Liberal Democrats	Adrian Alan Fullam	1,005	36.8	+14.7
Conservative	Ashley Carr	311	11.4	−9.1
Green	Prina Sumaria	231	8.5	New
Independent	Paul David Mouland	111	4.1	−3.6
For Britain	Chris Stone	25	0.9	−2.0
Majority		44	1.6	−23.1
Turnout		2,732	37.4	−3.3
Rejected ballots		10		
Labour hold		Swing	-11.6	

Topsham
Party	Candidate	Votes	%	±%
Labour	Joshua Cameron Ellis-Jones	1,413	47.3	+18.8
Conservative	Keith Andrew Sparkes*	1,154	38.6	−13.0
Green	Jonathan Robert Mills	384	12.9	+0.7
For Britain	Eric Bransden	35	1.2	New
Majority		259	8.7	N/A
Turnout		2,987	39.3	−3.6
Rejected ballots		12		
Labour gain from Conservative		Swing	+15.9	
