= 2012 Exeter City Council election =

2012 UK local government election

← 2011	3 May 2012	2014 →

14 of the 40 seats to Exeter City Council 21 seats needed for a majority
- Turnout: 33.57%
	First party	Second party	Third party
Party	Labour	Conservative	Liberal Democrats
Last election	19	11	9
Seats won	10	4	0
Seats after	24	11	5
Seat change	▲	Steady	▼
Popular vote	10,563	6,351	3,355
Percentage	44.1%	26.5%	14.0%
- Map showing the results of the 2012 Exeter City Council elections by ward. Red shows Labour seats and blue shows the Conservatives. Wards in grey had no election.
Council control before election
No overall control
Council control after election
Labour Party

The 2012 Exeter City Council election took place on 3 May 2012, to elect members of Exeter City Council in Devon, England. The election was held concurrently with other local elections in England. One third of the council was up for election; the seats up for election were last contested in 2008. The Labour Party gained overall control of the council, which had been under no overall control since 2003. The Liberal Party was wiped off the council.

== Results summary ==
2012 Exeter City Council election
Party	This election			Full council			This election		
Party	Seats	Net	Seats %	Other	Total	Total %	Votes	Votes %	+/−
Labour	10	▲6	71.4	15	25	62.5	10,563	44.1	+5.7
Conservative	4	▼1	28.6	6	10	25.0	6,351	26.5	-5.8
Liberal Democrats	0	▼5	0.0	4	4	10.0	3,355	14.0	-1.3
Liberal	0	Steady	0.0	1	1	2.5	0	0.0	-1.8
Green	0	Steady	0.0	0	0	0.0	1,880	7.9	+0.1
UKIP	0	Steady	0.0	0	0	0.0	1,438	6.0	+2.4
Your Decision	0	Steady	0.0	0	0	0.0	351	1.5	+0.8

== Ward results ==
=== Alphington ===
Alphington
Party	Candidate	Votes	%
Labour	Robert Crew	858	37.2%
Liberal Democrats	Alexandra Newcombe	618	26.8%
Conservative	John Corcoran	435	18.8%
UKIP	Andrew Dudgeon	270	11.7%
Green	Diana Moore	127	5.5%
Majority		260	10.4%
Turnout		2,308	
Labour gain from Liberal Democrats			

=== Exwick ===
Exwick
Party	Candidate	Votes	%
Labour	Oliver Pearson	993	54.5%
Conservative	Stephanie Warner	334	18.3%
UKIP	Lawrence Harper	240	13.2%
Green	Christopher Calvert	137	7.5%
Liberal Democrats	Alasdair Wood	119	6.5%
Majority		659	36.2%
Turnout		1,823	
Labour gain from Liberal Democrats			

=== Newtown ===
Newtown
Party	Candidate	Votes	%
Labour	Richard Branston	927	69.0%
Conservative	James Roberts	188	14.0%
Green	Thomas Milburn	112	8.3%
UKIP	Jacqueline Holdstock	71	5.3%
Liberal Democrats	John Ashton	45	3.4%
Majority		739	55.0%
Turnout		1,343	
Labour hold			

=== Pennsylvania ===
Pennsylvania
Party	Candidate	Votes	%
Conservative	Jake Donovan	595	34.1%
Liberal Democrats	Nigel Williams	574	32.9%
Labour	Gillian Nicholls	424	24.3%
Green	Christopher Barnett	151	8.7%
Majority		21	1.2%
Turnout		1,744	
Conservative gain from Liberal Democrats			

=== Pinhoe ===
Pinhoe
Party	Candidate	Votes	%
Labour	Simon Bowkett	1,022	47.7%
Conservative	Cynthia Thompson	742	34.7%
UKIP	Keith Crawford	240	11.2%
Liberal Democrats	Christine Fullam	69	3.2%
Green	Elizabeth Woodman	68	3.2%
Majority		280	13.0%
Turnout		2,141	
Labour gain from Conservative			

=== Polsloe ===
Polsloe
Party	Candidate	Votes	%
Labour	Rachel Lyons	681	45.9%
Conservative	James Taghdissian	463	31.2%
Green	Robert Graham	172	11.6%
UKIP	Graham Down	108	7.3%
Liberal Democrats	David Lockwood	61	4.1%
Majority		218	14.7%
Turnout		1,485	
Labour gain from Conservative			

=== Priory ===
Priory
Party	Candidate	Votes	%
Labour	Marcel Choules	1,194	54.3%
Conservative	Peter Holland	442	20.1%
Your Decision	Nicola Guagliardo	351	16.0%
Green	Rouben Freeman	111	5.1%
Liberal Democrats	Benjamin Noble	99	4.5%
Majority		752	34.2%
Turnout		2,197	
Labour hold			

=== St Davids ===
St Davids
Party	Candidate	Votes	%
Labour	Sarah Laws	386	34.0%
Liberal Democrats	Philip Brock	354	31.2%
Green	Andrew Bell	230	20.3%
Conservative	Louis Ten-Holter	165	14.5%
Majority		32	2.8%
Turnout		1,135	
Labour gain from Liberal Democrats			

=== St James ===
St James
Party	Candidate	Votes	%
Labour	Keith Owen	543	44.7%
Liberal Democrats	Christopher Townsend	369	30.4%
Conservative	Natalie Cox	129	10.6%
Green	Isaac Price-Sosner	126	10.4%
UKIP	Ralph Gay	47	3.9%
Majority		174	14.3%
Turnout		1,214	
Labour gain from Liberal Democrats			

=== St Leonards ===
St Leonards
Party	Candidate	Votes	%
Conservative	Norman Shiel	710	43.6%
Labour	Henry Lee	623	38.2%
Green	Alison Harcourt	216	13.3%
Liberal Democrats	Patrick Richmond	81	5.0%
Majority		87	5.4%
Turnout		1,630	
Conservative hold			

=== St Loyes ===
St Loyes
Party	Candidate	Votes	%
Conservative	Andrew Leadbetter	613	46.4%
Labour	Karl Knill	450	34.1%
Liberal Democrats	Sally Wilcox	143	10.8%
Green	Mark Cox	114	8.6%
Majority		163	12.3%
Turnout		1,320	
Conservative hold			

=== St Thomas ===
St Thomas
Party	Candidate	Votes	%
Labour	Robert Hannaford	854	47.2%
Liberal Democrats	Graeme Holloway	609	33.6%
UKIP	Brian Jeffery	134	7.4%
Green	Audaye Elesedy	113	6.2%
Conservative	Jordan di Trapani	100	5.5%
Majority		245	13.6%
Turnout		1,810	
Labour hold			

- Note: Robert Hannaford was elected as a Liberal Democrat at the previous election in 2008, but defected to Labour in 2010.

=== Topsham ===
Topsham
Party	Candidate	Votes	%
Conservative	Margaret Baldwin	1,100	59.8%
Labour	Eliot Wright	506	27.5%
Green	Susan Greenall	119	6.5%
Liberal Democrats	Caroline Nottle	114	6.2%
Majority		594	32.3%
Turnout		1,839	
Conservative hold			

=== Whipton & Barton ===
Whipton & Barton
Party	Candidate	Votes	%
Labour	Anthony Wardle	1,102	56.5%
Conservative	Christopher Crow	335	17.2%
UKIP	David Smith	328	16.8%
Liberal Democrats	Pamela Thickett	100	5.1%
Green	David Barker-Hahlo	84	4.3%
Majority		767	39.3%
Turnout		1,949	
Labour hold			
