= 2023 Exeter City Council election =

2023 UK local government election

← 2022	4 May 2023	2024 →

13 out of 39 seats to Exeter City Council 20 seats needed for a majority

	First party	Second party	Third party
Leader	Philip Bialyk	Diana Moore	Anne Jobson
Party	Labour	Green	Conservative
Last election	26 seats, 45.8%	5 seats, 21.7%	5 seats, 22.4%
Seats before	25	5	5
Seats won	7	3	1
Seats after	25	6	4
Seat change	▼1	▲1	▼1
Popular vote	14,111	7,098	6,334
Percentage	43.8%	22.0%	19.7%
Swing	▼2.0%	▲0.3%	▼2.7%
	Fourth party	Fifth party
Leader	Kevin Mitchell
Party	Liberal Democrats	Independent
Last election	2 seats, 9.4%	1 seat, 0.3%
Seats before	2	1
Seats won	2	0
Seats after	3	1
Seat change	▲1	▼1
Popular vote	3,908	564
Percentage	12.1%	1.8%
Swing	▲2.7%	▲1.5%
- Winner of each seat at the 2023 Exeter City Council election
Leader before election
Philip Bialyk
Labour
Leader after election
Philip Bialyk
Labour

The 2023 Exeter City Council election took place on 4 May 2023 to elect members of Exeter City Council in Devon, England. This was on the same day as other local elections in England.

Labour retained its majority of the seats on the council.

== Summary ==
=== Election result ===
2023 Exeter City Council election
Party	This election			Full council			This election		
Party	Seats	Net	Seats %	Other	Total	Total %	Votes	Votes %	+/−
Labour	7	▼1	53.8	18	25	64.1	14,111	43.8	–2.0
Green	3	▲1	23.1	3	6	15.4	7,098	22.0	+0.3
Conservative	1	▼1	7.7	3	4	10.3	6,334	19.7	–2.7
Liberal Democrats	2	▲1	15.4	1	3	7.7	3,908	12.1	+2.7
Independent	0	▼1	0.0	1	1	0.0	564	1.8	+1.5
Reform UK	0	Steady	0.0	0	0	0.0	57	0.2	N/A

== Ward results ==
The Statement of Persons Nominated, which details the candidates standing in each ward, was released by Exeter City Council following the close of nominations on 5 April 2023. The results for each ward were:

=== Alphington ===
Alphington
Party	Candidate	Votes	%	±%
Labour Co-op	Yvonne Atkinson*	1,187	51.7	+1.7
Conservative	Katherine New	653	28.4	−2.2
Green	John Bowman	306	13.3	+2.2
Liberal Democrats	Jamie Horner	150	6.5	−1.8
Majority		534	23.3	+3.9
Turnout		2296	36.24	−1.27
Labour hold				

=== Duryard and St. James ===
Duryard and St. James
Party	Candidate	Votes	%	±%
Liberal Democrats	Michael Mitchell*	938	42.3	−0.4
Labour Co-op	David Blagden	791	35.6	+1.6
Green	Simon Egan	278	12.5	+3.5
Conservative	Harry Johnson-Hill	213	9.6	−4.7
Majority		147	6.7	−2.1
Turnout		2229	33.14	+1.4
Liberal Democrats hold				

=== Exwick ===
Exwick
Party	Candidate	Votes	%	±%
Labour Co-op	Susannah Patrick	1,145	53.9	−5.4
Conservative	Kayleigh Luscombe	333	15.7	−1.8
Green	Mark Shorto	268	12.7	−2.1
Independent	Frankie Rufolo	263	12.4	+4.0
Liberal Democrats	Joanne Giencke	117	5.5	−2.1
Majority		812	38.2	+3.9
Turnout		2134	29.75	−1.8
Labour hold				

=== Heavitree ===
Heavitree
Party	Candidate	Votes	%	±%
Green	Carol Bennett*	1,308	43.5	−0.7
Labour	Gemma Rolstone	1,020	33.9	−3.8
Independent	Lucy Haigh	301	10.0	N/A
Conservative	Alfie Carlisle	278	9.2	−3.9
Liberal Democrats	Rod Ruffle	100	3.3	−1.6
Majority		288	9.6	+3.2
Turnout		3018	44.8	−2.6
Green hold		Swing	12.6	

=== Mincinglake and Whipton ===
Mincinglake and Whipton
Party	Candidate	Votes	%	±%
Labour	Ruth Williams*	1,191	61.9	+0.1
Conservative	David Luscombe	352	18.3	−3.8
Green	Alex Stephen	198	10.3	−0.1
Liberal Democrats	Mike Payne	184	9.6	+3.8
Majority		839	43.6	+3.9
Turnout		1938	29.65	−1.0
Labour hold				

=== Newtown and St. Leonard's ===
Newtown and St. Leonard's
Party	Candidate	Votes	%	±%
Green	Andy Ketchin	1,373	50.4	+9.8
Labour	Marilyn Whitton	1,035	38.0	−8.3
Conservative	Julian Gallie	213	7.8	−1.4
Liberal Democrats	Alexandra Newcombe	104	3.8	+0.2
Majority		318	12.4	
Turnout		2738	41.59	+0.1
Registered electors				
Green gain from Independent		Swing	9	

=== Pennsylvania ===
Pennsylvania
Party	Candidate	Votes	%	±%
Labour Co-op	Martyn Snow*	1,194	44.0	−1.2
Green	Lizzie Woodman	882	32.5	+11.1
Conservative	Robert Sheridan	423	15.6	−2.8
Liberal Democrats	Will Aczel	199	7.3	−5.1
Majority		312	11.5	−12.3
Turnout		2711	37.5	−1.2
Registered electors		7,258		
Labour Co-op hold		Swing		

=== Pinhoe ===
Pinhoe
Party	Candidate	Votes	%	±%
Labour	Mollie Miller	1,251	51.1	−0.4
Conservative	Cynthia Thompson	778	31.8	−3.7
Green	Ann Keen	227	9.3	+2.0
Liberal Democrats	Rory Clark	183	7.5	+1.8
Majority		473	19.3	+3.3
Turnout		2450	33.5	−2.4
Registered electors		7,317		
Labour hold		Swing		

=== Priory ===
Priory
Party	Candidate	Votes	%	±%
Labour	Jane Begley	1,062	51.6	−0.9
Conservative	Ben Hawkes	469	22.8	−7.6
Green	Joel Stobart	278	13.5	−0.2
Liberal Democrats	Philip Thomas	237	11.5	+1.8
Majority		593	28.8	+12.4
Turnout		2058	31.5	−3.4
Registered electors		6,543		
Labour hold		Swing		

=== St. David's ===
St. David's
Party	Candidate	Votes	%	±%
Green	Diana Moore*	1,322	55.1	+7.2
Labour Co-op	Ellen Stuart	752	31.3	−3.9
Conservative	George Baker	230	9.6	−3.0
Liberal Democrats	Andrew Soper	85	3.5	−1.1
Majority		570	23.8	+11.1
Turnout		2400	34.4	−2.1
Registered electors		6,977		
Green hold		Swing		

=== St. Loye's ===
St. Loye's
Party	Candidate	Votes	%	±%
Conservative	Alison Sheridan	1,127	45.7	−4.2
Labour Co-op	Jake Bonetta	980	39.7	+2.9
Green	Jack David Vickers	189	7.7	−5.9
Liberal Democrats	Phil Brock	164	6.6	N/A
Majority		147	6.0	−6.9
Turnout		2468	35.6	+0.9
Registered electors		6,939		
Conservative hold		Swing		

=== St. Thomas ===
St. Thomas
Party	Candidate	Votes	%	±%
Liberal Democrats	Adrian Fullam	1,217	43.9	+7.1
Labour	Deborah Darling	1,109	40.0	+1.6
Green	Johanna Korndorfer	210	7.6	−0.9
Conservative	Ashley Carr	167	6.0	−5.4
Reform UK	Natasha Hannaford	57	2.1	N/A
Majority		108	3.9	+2.3
Turnout		2771	38.1	+0.7
Registered electors				
Liberal Democrats gain from Labour		Swing	+7.1	

=== Topsham ===
Topsham
Party	Candidate	Votes	%	±%
Labour	Matthew Williams	1,394	46.4	−0.9
Conservative	Rob Newby*	1,098	36.6	−2.0
Green	Jonathan Mills	259	8.6	−4.3
Liberal Democrats	Christine Campion	230	7.7	N/A
Majority		296	9.8	+1.1
Turnout		3000	38.0	−1.3
Registered electors		7,896		
Labour gain from Conservative		Swing		
