= 2015 Exeter City Council election =

2015 UK local government election

← 2014	7 May 2015	2016 →

13 of the 40 seats to Exeter City Council 20 seats needed for a majority
	First party	Second party	Third party
Party	Labour	Conservative	Liberal Democrats
Seats before	27	10	3
Seats won	9	4	0
Seats after	29	10	1
Seat change	▲2	Steady	▼2
Popular vote	16,671	15,139	4,796
Percentage	36.4%	33.1%	10.5%
- Map showing the results of the 2015 Exeter City Council elections by ward. Red shows Labour seats and blue shows the Conservatives. Wards in grey had no election.
Council control before election
Labour
Council control after election
Labour

The 2015 Exeter City Council election took place on 7 May 2015, to elect members of Exeter City Council in Exeter, Devon, England. This was on the same day as other local elections.

== Results summary ==
2015 Exeter City Council election
Party	This election			Full council			This election		
Party	Seats	Net	Seats %	Other	Total	Total %	Votes	Votes %	+/−
Labour	9	▲2	69.2	20	29	72.5	16,671	36.4	-1.4
Conservative	4	Steady	30.8	6	10	25.0	15,139	33.1	+7.4
Liberal Democrats	0	▼2	0.0	1	1	2.5	4,941	10.8	+1.0
UKIP	0	Steady	0.0	0	0	0.0	4,595	10.0	-4.7
Green	0	Steady	0.0	0	0	0.0	4,252	9.3	-0.9
Left Unity	0	Steady	0.0	0	0	0.0	76	0.2	+0.1
TUSC	0	Steady	0.0	0	0	0.0	62	0.1	-0.8
BNP	0	Steady	0.0	0	0	0.0	47	0.1	±0.0

== Results by ward ==
=== Alphington ===
Alphington
Party	Candidate	Votes	%
Conservative	John Harvey	1,645	35.2%
Labour	Rachel Purtell	1,509	32.3%
UKIP	Dutch Dudgeon	554	11.9%
Liberal Democrats	Rod Ruffle	530	11.3%
Green	Andrew Bell	435	9.3%
Majority		136	2.9%
Turnout		4,700	70.79%
Conservative gain from Labour			

=== Cowick ===
Cowick
Party	Candidate	Votes	%
Labour	Paul Bull	1,261	40.3%
Conservative	Louis Ten-Holter	1,021	32.6%
UKIP	Peter Boardman	456	14.6%
Green	Emily Marsay	191	6.1%
Liberal Democrats	Sandy Chenore	185	5.9%
TUSC	Lily Cooper	16	0.5%
Majority		240	7.7%
Turnout		3,154	71.28%
Labour hold			

=== Duryard & St James ===
Duryard & St James
Party	Candidate	Votes	%
Conservative	Percy Prowse	1,267	
Labour	John Chilvers	560	
Green	David Barker-Hahlo	387	
Liberal Democrats	Aiden Graham	175	
UKIP	Anne Back	121	
TUSC	Luke Pilling	19	
Majority		707	28.0%
Turnout		2,540	77.23
Conservative hold			

=== Exwick ===
Exwick
Party	Candidate	Votes	%
Labour	Philip Bialyk	1,893	43.8%
Conservative	Alex Gewanter	1,201	27.8%
UKIP	Lawrence Harper	646	15.0%
Green	Mark Shorto	339	7.9%
Liberal Democrats	Aldo Visibelli	211	4.9%
TUSC	Andrew Duncan	27	0.6%
Majority		692	16.0%
Turnout		4,348	66.44%
Labour hold			

=== Heavitree ===
Heavitree
Party	Candidate	Votes	%
Labour	Greg Sheldon	1,247	37.9%
Conservative	Aric Gilinsky	903	27.8%
UKIP	Steve Jones	485	14.8%
Green	Ditch Townsend	357	10.9%
Liberal Democrats	Jackie Holdstock	295	9.0%
Majority		344	10.5%
Turnout		3,305	74.88
Labour hold			

=== Mincinglake & Whipton ===
Mincinglake & Whipton
Party	Candidate	Votes	%
Labour	Emma Morse	1,260	46.1%
Conservative	John Murphy	776	28.4%
UKIP	Brian Jeffery	415	15.2%
Green	Lizzie Woodman	162	5.9%
Liberal Democrats	Nick Sutton	121	4.4%
Majority		484	17.7%
Turnout		2,747	66.69%
Labour hold			

=== Priory ===
Priory
Party	Candidate	Votes	%
Labour	Kate Hannan	1,991	46.3%
Conservative	Paul Kenny	1,161	27.0%
UKIP	Peter Cook	608	14.1%
Green	Alex Taylor	319	7.4%
Liberal Democrats	Kevin Chun	200	4.6%
Left Unity	Matteo Mazzoleni	24	0.6%
Majority		830	19.3%
Turnout		4,345	63.41%
Labour hold			

=== St Davids ===
St Davids
Party	Candidate	Votes	%
Labour	Christine Buswell	834	26.5%
Liberal Democrats	Kevin Mitchell	799	25.4%
Conservative	Charles Beaty	766	24.3%
Green	Isaac Price-Sosner	638	20.2%
UKIP	Graham Stone	114	3.6%
Majority		35	1.1%
Turnout		3,169	56.64
Labour gain from Liberal Democrats			

=== St Leonards ===
St Leonards
Party	Candidate	Votes	%
Labour	Natalie Vizard	1,178	37.4%
Conservative	Stephanie Warner	1,156	36.7%
Green	Alysa Freeman	219	7.0%
Liberal Democrats	Morten Buus	426	13.5%
UKIP	Adrian Rogers	168	5.3%
Majority		22	0.7%
Turnout		3,161	79.08%
Labour gain from Conservative			

=== St Loyes ===
St Loyes
Party	Candidate	Votes	%
Conservative	David Henson	1,486	44.2%
Labour	Steve Frank	911	27.1%
UKIP	Alison Sheridan	449	13.4%
Liberal Democrats	Sally Wilcox	282	8.4%
Green	Neil Gratton	234	7.0%
Majority		575	17.1%
Turnout		3,389	70.40%
Conservative hold			

=== St Thomas ===
St Thomas
Party	Candidate	Votes	%
Labour	Hannah Packham	1,253	36.9%
Liberal Democrats	Adrian Fullam	1,106	32.5%
Conservative	Georgia Drinkwater	622	18.3%
Green	Kay Powell	348	10.2%
BNP	Chris Stone	47	1.4%
Left Unity	David Parks	24	0.7%
Majority		147	4.3%
Turnout		3,463	69.12%
Labour gain from Liberal Democrats			

=== Topsham ===
Topsham
Party	Candidate	Votes	%
Conservative	Rob Newby	2,105	53.7%
Labour	Eliot Wright	1,023	26.1%
Liberal Democrats	Sheila Hobden	451	11.5%
Green	John Moreman	342	8.7%
Majority		1,082	27.6%
Turnout		3,961	74.82%
Conservative hold			

=== St Thomas ===
St Thomas
Party	Candidate	Votes	%
Labour	Rosie Denham	1,751	45.7%
Conservative	Ruth Smith	1,030	26.9%
UKIP	Valerie Angus	579	15.1%
Green	Mark Cox	281	7.3%
Liberal Democrats	Mike Matuszczyk	160	4.2%
Left Unity	Ed Potts	28	0.7%
Majority		721	18.8%
Turnout		3,865	66.75%
Labour hold			
