= 2000 Exeter City Council election =

2000 UK local government election

← 1999	4 May 2000	2002 →

All 40 seats to Exeter City Council 21 seats needed for a majority
- Turnout: 34.0%
	First party	Second party
Party	Labour	Liberal Democrats
Last election	22	8
Seats won	22	8
Seat change	Steady	Steady
Percentage	33.4%	25.0%
	Third party	Fourth party
Party	Conservative	Liberal
Last election	3	3
Seats won	6	4
Seat change	▲3	▲1
Percentage	27.7%	8.6%
- Map showing the results of the 2000 Exeter City Council elections by ward. Red shows Labour seats, blue shows the Conservatives, yellow shows the Liberal Democrats and orange shows the Liberals. Striped wards indicate seats shared between parties.
Council control before election
Labour
Council control after election
Labour

The 2000 Exeter City Council election took place on 4 May 2000, to elect members of Exeter City Council in England. The entire council was up for election following boundary changes, which increased the number of seats from 36 to 40. The election was held concurrently with other local elections in England. The Labour Party retained control of the council, which it had held since 1995.

== Results summary ==
2000 Exeter City Council election
Party	This election			Full council			This election		
Party	Seats	Net	Seats %	Other	Total	Total %	Votes	Votes %	+/−
Labour	22	Steady	55.0	0	22	55.0	21,760	38.9	-5.4
Liberal Democrats	8	Steady	20.0	0	8	20.0	13,630	24.3	+3.2
Conservative	6	▲3	15.0	0	6	15.0	13,851	24.7	+3.4
Liberal	4	▲1	10.0	0	4	10.0	5,313	9.5	-2.5
Green	0	Steady	0.0	0	0	0.0	1,441	2.6	+1.2

== Ward results ==
=== Alphington (3) ===
Alphington
Party	Candidate	Votes	%
Liberal Democrats	M. Browning	1,492	
Liberal Democrats	P. Wadham	1,053	
Liberal Democrats	P. Smith	960	
Conservative	M. Jordan	515	
Labour	M. Hammond	396	
Labour	M. Walker	377	
Conservative	E. Ives	376	
Conservative	R. Sclater	365	
Labour	A. Hart	318	
Turnout		2,672	35.7%
Liberal Democrats hold			
Liberal Democrats hold			
Liberal Democrats win (new seat)			

=== Cowick (2) ===
Cowick
Party	Candidate	Votes	%
Labour	M. Mills	672	
Labour	B. Robson	571	
Conservative	G. Spivey	504	
Liberal Democrats	B. Wilcox	211	
Liberal Democrats	S. Wilcox	160	
Green	B. Knibbs	136	
Turnout			31.6%
Labour hold			
Labour hold			

=== Duryard (2) ===
Duryard
Party	Candidate	Votes	%
Liberal Democrats	C. Luxton	534	
Liberal Democrats	A. Dalby	497	
Conservative	S. Syvret	346	
Labour	D. Parker	224	
Labour	L. Powell	187	
Turnout			23.8%
Liberal Democrats win (new seat)			
Liberal Democrats win (new seat)			

=== Exwick (3) ===
Exwick
Party	Candidate	Votes	%
Labour	H. Slack	838	
Labour	R. Slack	794	
Labour	H. Catton	715	
Conservative	P. Johnson	364	
Conservative	C. Wilkins	338	
Liberal Democrats	J. Goddard	267	
Green	M. Hawkes	253	
Liberal Democrats	N. Goddard	245	
Registered electors		7,197	
Turnout			23.9%
Labour hold			
Labour hold			
Labour win (new seat)			

=== Heavitree (2) ===
Heavitree
Party	Candidate	Votes	%
Liberal	D. Morrish	1,062	
Liberal	P. Bennett	638	
Liberal Democrats	S. Hobden	578	
Conservative	D. Hambrook	313	
Liberal Democrats	M. Bransby-Williams	311	
Labour	I. Martin	276	
Labour	D. Dewar	250	
Green	J. Hayward	93	
Turnout			45.7%
Liberal hold			
Liberal gain from Liberal Democrats			

=== Mincinglake & Whipton (2) ===
Mincinglake & Whipton
Party	Candidate	Votes	%
Labour	A. Dean	606	
Labour	P. Oliver	560	
Conservative	J. Hedley	312	
Liberal Democrats	A. Soper	219	
Turnout			25.1%
Labour win (new seat)			
Labour win (new seat)			

=== Newtown (2) ===
Newtown
Party	Candidate	Votes	%
Labour	R. Branstone	565	
Labour	P. Shepherd	558	
Conservative	D. Henson	314	
Conservative	B. Coleman	281	
Liberal Democrats	S. Boult	246	
Liberal Democrats	T. Thompson	227	
Green	A. Thomas	180	
Liberal	J. Bahrij	46	
Turnout			30.7%
Labour win (new seat)			
Labour win (new seat)			

=== Pennsylvania (2) ===
Pennsylvania
Party	Candidate	Votes	%
Conservative	J. Coates	554	
Liberal Democrats	J. Holman	529	
Liberal Democrats	D. Treharne	486	
Labour	K. Moore	480	
Conservative	J. Brandon	473	
Labour	Sterry H.	436	
Green	S. Dunstan	127	
Turnout			37.7%
Conservative gain from Liberal Democrats			
Liberal Democrats hold			

=== Pinhoe (2) ===
Pinhoe
Party	Candidate	Votes	%
Labour	V. Dixon	871	
Labour	B. McNamara	760	
Conservative	J. Frappell	709	
Liberal Democrats	P. Holman	543	
Turnout			38.4%
Labour hold			
Labour hold			

=== Polsloe (2) ===
Polsloe
Party	Candidate	Votes	%
Labour	R. Lyons	615	
Conservative	Y. Henson	558	
Labour	G. Sheldon	552	
Conservative	J. Farquaharson	462	
Liberal Democrats	C. Miller	279	
Turnout			30.3%
Labour hold			
Conservative hold			

=== Priory (3) ===
Priory
Party	Candidate	Votes	%
Labour	O. Foggin	985	
Labour	M. Baldwin	943	
Labour	M. Midgely	936	
Conservative	A. Leadbetter	368	
Conservative	S. Bunting	353	
Liberal	J. Spicer	350	
Liberal	E. McCord	328	
Liberal	D. Firminger	314	
Liberal Democrats	S. Barratt	249	
Green	M-A. Moors	121	
Turnout			30.1%
Labour win (new seat)			
Labour win (new seat)			
Labour win (new seat)			

=== St. Davids (2) ===
St Davids
Party	Candidate	Votes	%
Liberal Democrats	P. Brock	585	
Liberal Democrats	S. Brock	489	
Labour	E. Jarvis	390	
Labour	B. Steane	350	
Conservative	G. Williams	195	
Green	A. Bruins	145	
Turnout			35.4%
Liberal Democrats hold			
Liberal Democrats gain from Labour			

=== St James (2) ===
St Davids
Party	Candidate	Votes	%
Labour	M. Griffiths	616	
Labour	M. Choules	476	
Green	T. Brenan	291	
Conservative	G. Hedley	254	
Conservative	J. Macdonald	251	
Liberal Democrats	P. Brock	585	
Liberal Democrats	S. Brock	489	
Turnout			26.1%
Labour win (new seat)			
Labour win (new seat)			

=== St Leonards (2) ===
St Leonards
Party	Candidate	Votes	%
Conservative	N. Shiel	830	
Conservative	J. Winterbottom	731	
Labour	R. Snowden	567	
Labour	N. Baldwin	533	
Liberal Democrats	R. Ruffle	309	
Liberal Democrats	D. Laming	276	
Turnout			47.2%
Conservative gain from Liberal Democrats			
Conservative gain from Liberal Democrats			

=== St. Loyes (2) ===
St Loyes
Party	Candidate	Votes	%
Liberal	D. Morrish	785	
Liberal	M. Danks	671	
Conservative	H. Arden	270	
Conservative	N. Le Gallais	204	
Labour	C. Gale	161	
Labour	C. Hemming	151	
Liberal Democrats	T. Reves	40	
Turnout			33.6%
Liberal hold			
Liberal hold			

=== St Thomas (2) ===
St Thomas
Party	Candidate	Votes	%
Labour	R. Hill	779	
Labour	C. Boyle	675	
Liberal Democrats	A. Fullam	404	
Liberal Democrats	N. Tremlett	367	
Conservative	R. Edwardson	171	
Conservative	G. Sclater	159	
Green	K. Morris	95	
Turnout			32.8%
Labour hold			
Labour hold			

=== Topsham (2) ===
Topsham
Party	Candidate	Votes	%
Conservative	M. Evans	1,517	
Conservative	D. Carr	914	
Liberal Democrats	D. Ballanyne	851	
Labour	D. Baldwin	273	
Labour	K. Owen	237	
Green	O. Michaelson	207	
Turnout			52.8%
Conservative hold			
Conservative hold			

=== Whipton & Barton (3) ===
Whipton & Barton
Party	Candidate	Votes	%
Labour	V. Long	939	
Labour	C. McNamara	927	
Labour	P. Edwards	916	
Conservative	J. White	435	
Conservative	P. White	406	
Liberal	E. Timms	398	
Liberal	A. Searle	364	
Liberal	K. Danks	357	
Liberal Democrats	A. Palmer	149	
Turnout			31.7%
Labour win (new seat)			
Labour win (new seat)			
Labour win (new seat)			
