= 2019 Exeter City Council election =

2019 UK local government election

← 2018	2 May 2019	2021 →

13 of 39 seats (One Third) to Exeter City Council 20 seats needed for a majority
	First party	Second party	Third party
Party	Labour	Conservative	Liberal Democrats
Seats before	29	8	1
Seats won	9	2	1
Seats after	29	6	2
Seat change	Steady	▼2	▲1
Popular vote	11,897	8,713	5,873
Percentage	36.4%	26.7%	18.0%
	Fourth party	Fifth party
Party	Green	Independent
Seats before	1	0
Seats won	1	1
Seats after	1	1
Seat change	Steady	▲1
Popular vote	2,776	1,486
Percentage	8.5%	4.5%
- Map showing the results of the 2019 Exeter City Council elections by ward. Red shows Labour seats, blue shows the Conservatives, yellow shows the Liberal Democrats, green shows the Green Party and silver shows Independent.

The 2019 Exeter City Council election took place on 2 May 2019 to elect the members of Exeter City Council in Devon, England. This was on the same day as other local elections. 14 of the 39 seats were up for re-election: those of the candidates who had finished second in the all-out election of 2016, with a double vacancy in Priory ward. The Labour Party remained in control with 29 seats, with the Conservatives as the main opposition party, with 6 seats.

== Council composition ==
Before this election, the composition of the council was:

↓
29	8	1	1
Labour	Conservative	LD	G

After this election, the composition of the council was:

↓
29	6	2	1	1
Labour	Conservative	LD	G	Ind

== Election summary ==
Exeter City Council Election Result 2019
Party	Candidates						Votes		
Party	Stood	Elected	Gained	Unseated	Net	% of total	%	No.	Net %
Labour	14	9	1	2	▼1	64.2	36.1	11,979	-11.1
Conservative	14	2	0	2	▼2	14.2	26.4	8,713	-6.1
Green	13	1	1	0	▲1	7.1	17.8	5,873	+7.3
Liberal Democrats	13	1	1	0	▲1	7.1	11.6	2,776	-2.1
UKIP	7	0	0	0	Steady	0.0	5.3	1,768	+5.3
Independent	2	1	1	0	▲1	7.1	4.5	1,486	+4.5
For Britain	1	0	0	0	Steady	0.0	0.3	113	+0.3
Women's Equality	1	0	0	0	Steady	0.0	0.2	66	-0.03
Total	64	14	4	4	Steady	100.0	100.0	32,883	▲434

== Results by ward ==
(*) Asterisk denotes the sitting councillor.

=== Alphington ===
Alphington
Party	Candidate	Votes	%
Labour	Yvonne Margaret Atkinson	901	37.2
Conservative	Katherine New	711	29.3
Green	Andrew Bell	396	16.3
UKIP	Dutch Dudgeon	222	9.2
Liberal Democrats	Rod Ruffle	202	8.3
Majority		190	7.9
Turnout		2,453	37.51
Labour gain from Green			

Note: The outgoing councillor Chris Musgrave was elected as Labour in 2016, but defected to the Green Party in February 2017.

=== Duryard & St James ===
Duryard & St James
Party	Candidate	Votes	%
Liberal Democrats	Michael Norman Mitchell	803	33.9
Conservative	Percy Prowse*	609	25.7
Labour	Charlie Davies	602	25.4
Green	Jonathan Dawson	292	12.3
Women's Equality	Bea Gare	66	2.8
Majority		194	8.2
Turnout		2,383	34.77
Liberal Democrats gain from Conservative			

=== Exwick ===
Exwick
Party	Candidate	Votes	%
Labour	Ollie Pearson*	1,034	44.5
Conservative	Kayleigh Michelle Suzanne Luscombe	576	24.8
Green	Mark Shorto	345	14.8
UKIP	Lawrence Simon Harper	298	12.8
Liberal Democrats	Joel Nicholas Punwani	73	3.1
Majority		458	19.7
Turnout		2,339	31.67
Labour hold			

=== Heavitree ===
Heavitree
Party	Candidate	Votes	%
Labour	Chris Buswell	1,170	42.7
Green	Gillian Clare Baker	746	27.2
Conservative	Robert Anthony Jones	577	21.1
Liberal Democrats	Stephen Michael Gates	246	9.0
Majority		424	15.5
Turnout		2,782	39.99
Labour hold			

=== Mincinglake & Whipton ===
Mincinglake & Whipton
Party	Candidate	Votes	%
Labour	Ruth Travis Williams	944	48.1
UKIP	Brian Jeffery	339	17.3
Conservative	Harry Charles Burton	316	16.1
Green	David Barker-Hahlo	248	12.6
Liberal Democrats	Andrew Matthew Soper	116	5.9
Majority		605	30.8
Turnout		1,975	29.54
Labour hold			

=== Newtown & St Leonards ===
Newtown & St Leonards
Party	Candidate	Votes	%
Independent	Jemima Moondaisy Moore	1,359	48.6
Labour	Carol Whitton	1,092	39.1
Conservative	Jago Barnabas York Brockway	342	12.2
Majority		267	9.5
Turnout		2,813	39.05
Independent gain from Labour			

=== Pennsylvania ===
Pennsylvania
Party	Candidate	Votes	%
Labour	Ian Quance	1,109	39.0
Conservative	David Smith	889	31.3
Green	Lizzie Woodman	683	24.0
Liberal Democrats	Ian Robert Bristow	163	5.7
Majority		220	7.7
Turnout		2,867	37.20
Labour hold			

=== Pinhoe ===
Pinhoe
Party	Candidate	Votes	%
Labour	Trish Oliver	928	38.4
Conservative	Cynthia Thompson*	913	37.8
UKIP	Robert Ball	262	10.8
Green	Frank Williamson	226	9.4
Liberal Democrats	Felix Brett	86	3.6
Majority		15	0.6
Turnout		2,435	38.27
Labour gain from Conservative			

=== Priory (2 seats) ===
Priory
Party	Candidate	Votes	%
Labour	Amal Ghusain	895	37.2
Labour	Alys Amelia Quance	850	35.4
Conservative	John Benedict Harvey	631	26.3
Conservative	Keith Andrew Sparkes	597	24.8
Green	Lynn Wetenhall	362	15.1
UKIP	Diana Beasley	359	14.9
Green	Mary Roddick	359	14.9
UKIP	Sheridan Robert James	316	13.2
Liberal Democrats	Christine Campion	232	9.7
Liberal Democrats	Ramus Jakob Lindgren	109	4.5
Turnout		2,412	36.82
Labour hold			
Labour hold			

=== St Davids ===
St Davids
Party	Candidate	Votes	%
Green	Diana Frances Moore	1,455	54.9
Labour	Lesley Sara Robson	796	30.1
Conservative	Aric Samuel David Gilinsky	270	10.2
Liberal Democrats	Charles Cole	126	4.8
Majority		659	24.8
Turnout		2,667	35.61
Green gain from Labour			

=== St Loyes ===
St Loyes
Party	Candidate	Votes	%
Conservative	Yolonda Anna Cullis Henson	1,140	47.6
Labour	George Lawrence Ford	550	23.0
UKIP	Alison Sheridan	288	12.0
Liberal Democrats	Thomas Jacob Deakin	206	8.6
Green	Christo Skelton	206	8.6
Majority		590	24.6
Turnout		2402	34.32
Conservative hold			

=== St Thomas ===
St Thomas
Party	Candidate	Votes	%
Labour	Hannah Louise Packham*	1,082	41.0
Conservative	Ashley Christopher Carr	484	18.4
Green	Joe Levy	447	17.0
Liberal Democrats	Adrian Alan Fullam	383	14.5
Independent	Paul David Mouland	127	4.8
For Britain	Frankie Rufolo	113	4.3
Majority		598	22.6
Turnout		2,658	35.36
Labour hold			

=== Topsham ===
Topsham
Party	Candidate	Votes	%
Conservative	Rob Newby	1,255	47.3
Labour	Eliot Paul Wright	794	29.9
Green	Melanie Frances Shaw	467	17.6
Liberal Democrats	Aaron Benjamin Nolan	140	5.3
Majority		461	17.4
Turnout		2,697	37.97
Conservative hold			
