= 2011 Exeter City Council election =

2011 UK local government election

← 2010	5 May 2011	2012 →

13 of the 40 seats to Exeter City Council 21 seats needed for a majority
- Turnout: 42.95%
	First party	Second party
Party	Labour	Conservative
Last election	15	11
Seats won	7	4
Seats after	19	11
Seat change	▲4	Steady
Popular vote	10,685	8,969
Percentage	38.4%	32.3%
	Third party	Fourth party
Party	Liberal Democrats	Liberal
Last election	11	3
Seats won	2	0
Seats after	9	1
Seat change	▼2	▼2
Popular vote	4,257	501
Percentage	15.3%	1.8%
- Map showing the results of the 2011 Exeter City Council elections by ward. Red shows Labour seats, blue shows the Conservatives and yellow shows the Liberal Democrats. Wards in white had no election.
Council control before election
No overall control
Council control after election
No overall control

The 2011 Exeter City Council election took place on 5 May 2011, to elect members of Exeter City Council in Devon, England. The election was held concurrently with other local elections in England. One third of the council was up for election; the seats up for election were last contested in 2007. The council remained under no overall control with the Labour Party as the largest party.

== Results summary ==
2011 Exeter City Council election
Party	This election			Full council			This election		
Party	Seats	Net	Seats %	Other	Total	Total %	Votes	Votes %	+/−
Labour	7	▲4	53.8	12	19	47.5	10,685	38.4	+2.5
Conservative	4	Steady	30.8	7	11	27.5	8,969	32.3	-0.4
Liberal Democrats	2	▼2	15.4	7	9	22.5	4,257	15.3	-4.9
Liberal	0	▼2	0.0	1	1	2.5	501	1.8	+0.2
Green	0	Steady	0.0	0	0	0.0	2,163	7.8	+1.8
UKIP	0	Steady	0.0	0	0	0.0	1,008	3.6	+0.4
Your Decision	0	Steady	0.0	0	0	0.0	191	0.7	N/A
TUSC	0	Steady	0.0	0	0	0.0	26	0.1	N/A

== Ward results ==
=== Alphington ===
Alphington
Party	Candidate	Votes	%
Labour	Margaret Clark	875	33.4%
Conservative	David Thompson	702	26.8%
Liberal Democrats	Peter Wadham	677	25.8%
Green	Andrew Bell	201	7.7%
UKIP	Andrew Dudgeon	165	6.3%
Majority		173	6.6%
Turnout		2,620	
Labour gain from Liberal Democrats			

=== Cowick ===
Cowick
Party	Candidate	Votes	%
Labour	Paul Bull	981	47.2%
Conservative	Jake Donovan	774	37.2%
Liberal Democrats	Helen Bray	185	8.9%
Green	Arabella Fraser	140	6.7%
Majority		207	10.0%
Turnout		2,080	
Labour gain from Conservative			

=== Duryard ===
Duryard
Party	Candidate	Votes	%
Conservative	Percy Prowse	855	51.4%
Liberal Democrats	Christopher Earle	367	22.1%
Labour	Oliver Pearson	269	16.2%
Green	Elizabeth Woodman	173	10.4%
Majority		488	29.3%
Turnout		1,664	
Conservative hold			

=== Exwick ===
Exwick
Party	Candidate	Votes	%
Labour	Philip Bialyk	1,254	52.2%
Conservative	Graham Watson	614	25.6%
Liberal Democrats	Liam Martin	335	14.0%
Green	Rouben Freeman	198	8.2%
Majority		640	26.6%
Turnout		2,401	
Labour gain from Liberal Democrats			

=== Heavitree ===
Heavitree
Party	Candidate	Votes	%
Labour	Gregory Sheldon	920	40.3%
Conservative	Martin Sarl	630	27.6%
Liberal Democrats	Patrick Elsdon	292	12.8%
Green	Sue Greenall	259	11.4%
UKIP	David Smith	180	7.9%
Majority		290	12.7%
Turnout		2,281	
Labour gain from Liberal			

=== Mincinglake & Whipton ===
Mincinglake & Whipton
Party	Candidate	Votes	%
Labour	Catherine Dawson	825	53.7%
Conservative	Rachael Parkhouse	365	23.8%
UKIP	Keith Crawford	182	11.9%
Liberal Democrats	David Lockwood	88	5.7%
Green	Christopher Barnett	75	4.9%
Majority		460	29.9%
Turnout		1,535	
Labour hold			

=== Priory ===
Priory
Party	Candidate	Votes	%
Labour	Gillian Tippins	1,311	51.4%
Conservative	John Corcoran	726	28.4%
Your Decision	Nicola Guagliardo	191	7.5%
Green	Keith Hyams	164	6.4%
Liberal Democrats	Christine Fullam	160	6.3%
Majority		585	23.0%
Turnout		2,552	
Labour hold			

=== St James ===
St James
Party	Candidate	Votes	%
Liberal Democrats	Kevin Mitchell	580	35.2%
Labour	Keith Owen	545	33.0%
Conservative	Natalie Cox	270	16.4%
Green	Isaac Price-Sosner	212	12.8%
UKIP	Ralph Gay	43	2.6%
Majority		35	2.2%
Turnout		1,650	
Liberal Democrats hold			

=== St Leonards ===
St Leonards
Party	Candidate	Votes	%
Conservative	John Winterbottom	984	44.9%
Labour	Henry Lee	715	32.6%
Green	Alison Harcourt	276	12.6%
Liberal Democrats	Benjamin Noble	216	9.9%
Majority		269	12.3%
Turnout		2,191	
Conservative hold			

=== St Loyes ===
St Loyes
Party	Candidate	Votes	%
Conservative	David Henson	748	37.5%
Liberal	Margaret Danks	501	25.1%
Labour	Robert Crew	393	19.7%
UKIP	Michael Amor	169	8.5%
Liberal Democrats	Christopher Townsend	125	6.3%
Green	Mark Cox	57	2.9%
Majority		247	12.4%
Turnout		1,993	
Conservative gain from Liberal			

=== St Thomas ===
St Thomas
Party	Candidate	Votes	%
Liberal Democrats	Adrian Fullam	846	40.0%
Labour	Rachel Lyons	769	36.3%
Conservative	Oliver Wooding	275	13.0%
Green	Audaye Elesedy	123	5.8%
UKIP	Douglas Brailey	104	4.9%
Majority		77	3.7%
Turnout		2,117	
Liberal Democrats hold			

=== Topsham ===
Topsham
Party	Candidate	Votes	%
Conservative	Rob Newby	1,306	56.3%
Labour	Eliot Wright	633	27.3%
Liberal Democrats	Caroline Nottle	211	9.1%
Green	Thomas Milburn	169	7.3%
Majority		673	29.0%
Turnout		2,319	
Conservative hold			

=== Whipton & Barton ===
Whipton & Barton
Party	Candidate	Votes	%
Labour	Rosie Denham	1,195	49.9%
Conservative	Ruth Smith	720	30.0%
Liberal Democrats	Pamela Thickett	175	7.3%
UKIP	Graham Down	165	6.9%
Green	Jeff Ridley	116	4.8%
TUSC	James Thomson	26	1.1%
Majority		475	19.9%
Turnout		2,397	
Labour hold			
