= 2024 Exeter City Council election =

English local election

← 2023	2 May 2024	2026 →

13 out of 39 seats to Exeter City Council 20 seats needed for a majority

	First party	Second party	Third party
Leader	Philip Bialyk	Diana Moore	Michael Mitchell
Party	Labour	Green	Liberal Democrats
Last election	25 seats, 43.8%	6 seats, 22.0%	3 seats, 12.1%
Seats before	24 (Note: Includes one vacant seat that was last held by Labour.)	6	3
Seats won	8	2	1
Seats after	24	7	4
Seat change	Steady	▲1	▲1
Popular vote	12,273	6,573	3,323
Percentage	38.1%	20.4%	10.3%
Swing	▼5.7%	▼1.6%	▼1.8%
	Fourth party	Fifth party
Leader	Anne Jobson
Party	Conservative	Independent
Last election	4 seats, 19.7%	1 seat, 1.8%
Seats before	4	2
Seats won	1	1
Seats after	3	1
Seat change	▼1	▼1
Popular vote	5,945	4,082
Percentage	18.5%	12.7%
Swing	▼1.2%	▲10.9%
- Winner of each seat at the 2024 Exeter City Council election
Leader before election
Philip Bialyk
Labour
Leader after election
Philip Bialyk
Labour

The 2024 Exeter City Council election took place on 2 May 2024 to elect members of Exeter City Council in Devon, England. This was on the same day as other local elections. There were 13 of 39 seats on the council up for election, being the usual third of the council.

Labour retained its majority on the council.

== Summary ==
=== Election result ===
2024 Exeter City Council election
Party	This election			Full council			This election		
Party	Seats	Net	Seats %	Other	Total	Total %	Votes	Votes %	+/−
Labour	8	Steady	61.5	16	24	61.5	12,273	38.1	–5.7
Green	2	▲1	15.4	5	7	17.9	6,573	20.4	–1.6
Liberal Democrats	1	▲1	7.7	3	4	10.3	3,323	10.3	–1.8
Conservative	1	▼1	7.7	3	3	7.7	5,945	18.5	–1.2
Independent	1	▼1	7.7	0	1	2.6	4,082	12.7	+10.9

== Ward results ==
The Statement of Persons Nominated, which details the candidates standing in each ward, was released by Exeter City Council following the close of nominations on 8 April 2024.

=== Alphington ===
Alphington
Party	Candidate	Votes	%	±%
Labour	Rob Harding	997	46.0	−4.7
Conservative	Katherine New	606	28.0	−0.4
Green	Benn Harrison	289	13.3	±0.0
Liberal Democrats	Jamie Horner	151	7.0	+0.5
Independent	Mark Harreld	125	5.8	N/A
Majority		389	18.0	
Turnout		2,179	34.24	
Registered electors		6,363		
Labour hold		Swing		

=== Duryard & St. James ===
Duryard & St. James
Party	Candidate	Votes	%	±%
Liberal Democrats	Tammy Palmer	891	45.4	+3.1
Labour Co-op	Tony Badcott	619	31.5	−4.1
Green	Martha Lee	270	13.7	+1.2
Conservative	Rory More O'Ferrall	184	9.4	−0.2
Majority		272	13.9	
Turnout		1,981	27.25	
Registered electors		7,269		
Liberal Democrats gain from Labour		Swing		

=== Exwick ===
Exwick
Party	Candidate	Votes	%	±%
Labour Co-op	Philip Bialyk*	1,060	51.2	−2.7
Independent	Frankie Rufolo	371	17.9	+5.5
Conservative	Kayleigh Luscombe	256	12.2	−3.5
Green	Eric Helianthus	252	12.2	−0.5
Liberal Democrats	Charles Curnock	130	6.3	+0.8
Majority		689		
Turnout		2,077	28.5	
Registered electors		7,280		
Labour hold		Swing		

=== Heavitree ===
Heavitree
Party	Candidate	Votes	%	±%
Independent	Lucy Haigh	1,171	36.0	+26.0
Green	Jack Eade	948	29.1	−14.4
Labour	Dave Mutton	705	21.7	−12.2
Conservative	Joan Collacott	355	10.9	+1.7
Liberal Democrats	Rod Ruffle	76	2.3	−1.0
Majority		223	6.9	
Turnout		3,265	48.80	
Registered electors				
Independent gain from Labour		Swing		

=== Mincinglake & Whipton ===
Mincinglake & Whipton
Party	Candidate	Votes	%	±%
Labour	Liz Pole	842	38.5	−23.4
Independent	Clive Hutchings	775	35.4	N/A
Conservative	Oscar Brown	290	13.3	−5.0
Green	Alex Stephan	169	7.7	−2.6
Liberal Democrats	Michael Payne	111	5.1	−4.5
Majority		67	3.1	
Turnout		2,193	33.67	
Registered electors		6,514		
Labour hold		Swing		

=== Newtown & St. Leonard's ===
Newtown & St. Leonard's
Party	Candidate	Votes	%	±%
Green	Lynn Wetenhall	1,215	47.0	−3.4
Labour	Julian Cabrera	941	36.4	−1.6
Conservative	Keith Sparkes	211	8.4	+0.4
Independent	Paul Simmonds	122	4.7	N/A
Liberal Democrats	Philip Brock	96	3.7	−0.1
Majority		274	10.6	
Turnout		2,592	39.1	
Registered electors				
Green gain from Labour		Swing		

=== Pennsylvania ===
Pennsylvania
Party	Candidate	Votes	%	±%
Labour	Zoë Hughes	1,106	38.8	−5.2
Green	Jack Vickers	878	30.8	−1.7
Conservative	Jack Hunt	390	13.7	−1.9
Independent	Victoria Jarman	297	10.4	N/A
Liberal Democrats	Nigel Williams	177	6.2	−1.1
Majority		228	8.0	
Turnout		2,848	39.60	
Registered electors				
Labour hold		Swing		

=== Pinhoe ===
Pinhoe
Party	Candidate	Votes	%	±%
Labour Co-op	Jakir Hussain	1,019	41.9	−9.2
Conservative	David Thompson	580	23.8	−8.0
Independent	Susan Simmonds	314	12.9	N/A
Green	Kate Jago	300	12.3	+3.0
Liberal Democrats	Christine Campion	220	9.0	+1.5
Majority		439	18.1	
Turnout		2,433	32.37	
Registered electors				
Labour gain from Independent		Swing		

=== Priory ===
Priory
Party	Candidate	Votes	%	±%
Labour	Tony Wardle*	888	41.9	−9.7
Independent	Tal Abdulrazaq	443	20.9	N/A
Conservative	David Luscombe	344	16.2	−6.6
Green	Heather Mullett	233	11.0	−2.5
Liberal Democrats	Philip Thomas	209	9.9	−1.6
Majority		445	21.0	
Turnout		2,117	32.34	
Registered electors				
Labour hold		Swing		

=== St. David's ===
St. David's
Party	Candidate	Votes	%	±%
Green	James Banyard	1,187	51.0	−4.1
Labour Co-op	Ellen Stuart	785	33.7	+2.4
Conservative	Rob Newby	248	10.7	+1.1
Liberal Democrats	Harry Wright	107	4.6	+1.1
Majority		402	17.3	
Turnout		2,327	33.30	
Registered electors				
Green hold		Swing		

=== St. Loye's ===
St. Loye's
Party	Candidate	Votes	%	±%
Conservative	Anne Jobson*	1,220	48.6	+2.9
Labour Co-op	Jake Bonetta	914	36.4	−3.3
Green	Deb Hancock	211	8.4	+0.7
Liberal Democrats	Timothy Butters	167	6.6	±0.0
Majority		306	12.2	
Turnout		2,512	36.69	
Registered electors				
Conservative hold		Swing		

=== St. Thomas ===
St. Thomas
Party	Candidate	Votes	%	±%
Labour Co-op	Deborah Darling	1,058	38.3	−1.7
Liberal Democrats	Alexandra Newcombe	771	27.9	−16.0
Independent	Rob Hannaford*	464	16.8	N/A
Green	Andy Bragg	299	10.8	+3.2
Conservative	Ashley Carr	167	6.1	+0.1
Majority		287	10.4	
Turnout		2,759	38.10	
Registered electors				
Labour Co-op gain from Independent		Swing		

=== Topsham ===
Topsham
Party	Candidate	Votes	%	±%
Labour	Gemma Rolstone	1,339	45.1	−1.3
Conservative	Cynthia Thompson	1,094	36.8	+0.2
Green	Sarah Finch	322	10.8	+2.2
Liberal Democrats	Alan Williamson	217	7.3	−0.4
Majority		245	8.3	
Turnout		2,972	37.33	
Registered electors				
Labour gain from Conservative		Swing		
