= 2021 Exeter City Council election =

2021 UK local government election

← 2019	6 May 2021	2022 →

13 of 39 seats (One Third) to Exeter City Council 20 seats needed for a majority
	First party	Second party	Third party
Party	Labour	Conservative	Green
Seats before	29	6	1
Seats won	11	2	1
Seats after	28	6	2
Seat change	▼1	Steady	▲1
Popular vote	16,756	11,381	5,947
Percentage	44.4%	30.1%	15.7%
- Map showing the results of the 2021 Exeter City Council elections by ward. Red shows Labour seats, blue shows the Conservatives, green shows the Green Party.

The 2021 Exeter City Council election took place on 6 May 2021 to elect the members of Exeter City Council in Devon, England. This was on the same day as other local elections. Two candidates were elected to the Mincinglake and Whipton ward due to a by-election taking place the same day following the death of a Councillor some months earlier. These Elections were due to take place in 2020, but were delayed due to the COVID-19 pandemic.

== Results summary ==
2021 Exeter City Council election
Party	This election			Full council			This election		
Party	Seats	Net	Seats %	Other	Total	Total %	Votes	Votes %	+/−
Labour	11	▼1	78.6	17	28	71.8	16,756	44.4	+8.3
Conservative	2	Steady	14.3	4	6	15.4	11,381	30.1	+3.7
Green	1	▲1	7.1	1	2	5.1	5,947	15.7	-2.1
Liberal Democrats	0	Steady	0.0	2	2	5.1	3,160	8.4	-3.2
Independent	0	Steady	0.0	1	1	2.6	231	0.6	-3.9
Women's Equality	0	Steady	0.0	0	0	0.0	188	0.5	+0.3
For Britain	0	Steady	0.0	0	0	0.0	118	0.3	±0.0

== Ward results ==
=== Alphington ===
Alphington
Party	Candidate	Votes	%	±%
Labour	Steve Warwick	1,157	43.5	+6.3
Conservative	Katherine New	1,064	40.0	+10.7
Green	Julyan Levy	248	9.3	−7.0
Liberal Democrats	Rod Ruffle	191	7.2	−1.1
Majority		93	3.5	−4.4
Turnout		2,684	41.3	+3.8
Labour hold		Swing		

=== Duryard and St. James ===
Duryard and St. James
Party	Candidate	Votes	%	±%
Labour	Martin Pearce	980	39.8	+14.4
Liberal Democrats	Will Aczel	795	32.3	−1.6
Conservative	Aric Gilinsky	497	20.2	−5.5
Women's Equality	Bea Gare	188	7.6	+4.8
Majority		185	7.5	
Turnout		2,481	32.5	−2.3
Labour hold		Swing		

=== Exwick ===
Exwick
Party	Candidate	Votes	%	±%
Labour Co-op	Philip Bialyk	1,280	50.6	+6.1
Conservative	Kayleigh Luscombe	792	31.3	+6.5
Green	Jamie Lynde	353	13.9	−0.9
Liberal Democrats	Maya Skelton	107	4.2	+1.1
Majority		488	19.3	−0.4
Turnout		2,559	35.0	+3.3
Labour Co-op hold		Swing		

=== Heavitree ===
Heavitree
Party	Candidate	Votes	%	±%
Labour	Barbara Denning	1,255	39.0	−3.7
Green	Catherine Rees	1,239	38.5	+11.3
Conservative	Alfie Carlisle	725	22.5	+1.4
Majority		16	0.5	−15.0
Turnout		3,235	46.7	+6.7
Labour hold		Swing		

=== Mincinglake and Whipton ===
Mincinglake and Whipton
Party	Candidate	Votes	%	±%
Labour	Emma Morse	1,059	45.5	−2.6
Labour	Naima Allcock	1,052	45.2	−2.9
Conservative	Edward Barradell	682	29.3	+13.2
Conservative	Joseph Straker	513	22.0	+5.9
Green	David Barker-Hahlo	383	16.4	+3.8
Liberal Democrats	Felix Brett	160	6.9	+1.0
Turnout		2,329	34.4	+4.9
Labour hold		Swing		
Labour hold		Swing		

=== Newtown and St. Leonard's ===
Newtown and St. Leonard's
Party	Candidate	Votes	%	±%
Labour	Richard Branston	1,388	44.7	+5.6
Green	Dan Grey	1,262	40.7	New
Conservative	George Smith	452	14.6	+2.4
Majority		126	4.0	
Turnout		3,130	42.2	+3.1
Labour hold		Swing		

=== Pennsylvania ===
Pennsylvania
Party	Candidate	Votes	%	±%
Labour	Zion Lights	1,655	52.1	+13.1
Conservative	Samuel Barnett	895	28.2	−3.1
Liberal Democrats	Nigel Williams	625	19.7	+14.0
Majority		760	23.9	−16.1
Turnout		3,207	40.8	+3.6
Labour hold		Swing		

=== Pinhoe ===
Pinhoe
Party	Candidate	Votes	%	±%
Labour	David Harvey	1,310	49.0	+10.6
Conservative	John Harvey	978	36.6	−1.2
Green	Lynn Wetenhall	237	8.9	−0.5
Liberal Democrats	Henry Mayall	148	5.5	+1.9
Majority		332	12.4	+11.8
Turnout		2,690	40.1	+1.8
Labour hold		Swing		

=== Priory ===
Priory
Party	Candidate	Votes	%	±%
Labour	Alys Martin	1,243	50.1	+14.7
Conservative	James Taghdissian	824	33.2	+5.9
Green	Charles Russett	303	12.2	−2.9
Liberal Democrats	Joel Punwani	111	4.5	−5.2
Majority		419	16.9	
Turnout		2,502	37.7	+0.9
Labour hold		Swing		

=== St. David's ===
St. David's
Party	Candidate	Votes	%	±%
Green	Amy Sparling	1,276	45.4	−9.5
Labour	Carol Whitton	1,063	37.8	+7.7
Conservative	Arden Foster-Spinks	472	16.8	+6.6
Majority		213	7.6	N/A
Turnout		2,829	37.5	+1.9
Green gain from Labour		Swing		

=== St. Loye's ===
St. Loye's
Party	Candidate	Votes	%	±%
Conservative	Anne Jobson	1,234	46.6	−1.0
Labour	Olwen Foggin	1,004	37.9	+14.9
Green	Jack Eade	258	9.7	+1.1
Liberal Democrats	Kris Mears	119	4.5	−4.1
For Britain	Debbie Frayne	32	1.2	N/A
Majority		230	8.7	−15.9
Turnout		2,662	38.0	+3.7
Conservative hold		Swing		

=== St. Thomas ===
St. Thomas
Party	Candidate	Votes	%	±%
Labour Co-op	Rob Hannaford	1,404	46.8	+5.8
Liberal Democrats	Adrian Fullam	661	22.1	+7.6
Conservative	Ashley Carr	615	20.5	+2.1
Independent	Paul Mouland	231	7.7	+2.9
For Britain	Frankie Rufolo	86	2.9	−1.4
Majority		743	24.7	
Turnout		3,021	40.7	+5.3
Labour Co-op hold		Swing		

=== Topsham ===
Topsham
Party	Candidate	Votes	%	±%
Conservative	Andrew Leadbetter	1,638	51.6	+4.3
Labour	Ivan Jordan	906	28.5	−1.4
Green	Jon Mills	388	12.2	−5.4
Liberal Democrats	Christine Campion	243	7.7	+2.4
Majority		732	23.1	+5.7
Turnout		3,194	42.9	+4.9
Conservative hold		Swing		
