= 2002 Exeter City Council election =

2002 UK local government election

← 2000	2 May 2002	2003 →

13 of the 40 seats to Exeter City Council 21 seats needed for a majority
- Turnout: 34.2%
	First party	Second party
Party	Labour	Liberal Democrats
Last election	22	8
Seats won	7	1
Seats after	22	8
Seat change	Steady	Steady
Popular vote	8,514	4,707
Percentage	39.6%	21.9%
	Third party	Fourth party
Party	Conservative	Liberal
Last election	6	4
Seats won	4	1
Seats after	6	4
Seat change	Steady	Steady
Popular vote	5,221	1,586
Percentage	24.3%	7.4%
- Map showing the results of the 2002 Exeter City Council elections by ward. Red shows Labour seats, blue shows the Conservatives, yellow shows the Liberal Democrats and orange shows the Liberals. Wards in white had no election.
Council control before election
Labour
Council control after election
Labour

The 2002 Exeter City Council election took place on 2 May 2002, to elect members of Exeter City Council in England. The election was held concurrently with other local elections in England. One third of the council was up for election and the Labour Party retained control of the council, which it had held since 1995.

== Results summary ==
2002 Exeter City Council election
Party	This election			Full council			This election		
Party	Seats	Net	Seats %	Other	Total	Total %	Votes	Votes %	+/−
Labour	7	Steady	53.8	15	22	55.0	8,514	39.6	+0.7
Liberal Democrats	4	Steady	30.8	4	8	20.0	4,707	21.9	-2.4
Conservative	1	Steady	7.7	5	6	15.0	5,178	24.1	-0.6
Liberal	1	Steady	7.7	3	4	10.0	1,586	7.4	-2.1
Green	0	Steady	0.0	0	0	0.0	1,265	5.9	+3.3
Independent	0	Steady	0.0	0	0	0.0	164	0.8	N/A
UKIP	0	Steady	0.0	0	0	0.0	94	0.4	New

== Ward results ==
=== Alphington ===
Alphington
Party	Candidate	Votes	%
Liberal Democrats	Paul Smith	1,200	52.2%
Conservative	Margaret Jordan	515	24.3%
Labour	Allan Hart	482	21.0%
Green	Francis Duke	60	2.6%
Majority		642	27.9%
Turnout			35.8%
Liberal Democrats hold			

=== Cowick ===
Cowick
Party	Candidate	Votes	%
Labour	Barry McNamara	841	49.2%
Conservative	Margaret Baldwin	598	35.0%
Liberal Democrats	Rodney Ruffle	148	8.7%
UKIP	Lawrence Harper	62	3.6%
Green	B. Knibbs	136	3.5%
Majority		243	14.2%
Turnout			39.6%
Labour hold			

=== Duryard ===
Duryard
Party	Candidate	Votes	%
Liberal Democrats	Andrew Dalby	541	47.3%
Conservative	Keith Nelson-Tomsen	347	30.3%
Labour	Kevin Moore	173	15.1%
Green	Brendan Kelly	83	7.3%
Majority		194	17.0%
Turnout			25.4%
Liberal Democrats hold			

=== Exwick ===
Exwick
Party	Candidate	Votes	%
Labour	Howard Catton	752	51.5%
Conservative	Gerald Sclater	293	20.1%
Liberal Democrats	Sally Wilcox	243	16.6%
Green	Michael Hawkes	172	11.8%
Majority		459	31.4%
Turnout			23.1%
Labour hold			

=== Heavitree ===
Heavitree
Party	Candidate	Votes	%
Liberal	Paul Bennett	913	55.5%
Labour	Ian Martin	357	21.7%
Conservative	Jonathan Sandys	259	15.7%
Green	J. Hayward	93	
Majority		556	33.8%
Turnout			39.3%
Liberal hold			

=== Mincinglake ===
Mincinglake & Whipton
Party	Candidate	Votes	%
Labour	Paul Oliver	646	61.8%
Conservative	James Bacon	235	22.5%
Liberal Democrats	Andrew Soper	126	12.0%
Green	Therese Canning	39	3.7%
Majority		411	39.3%
Turnout			25.9%
Labour hold			

=== Newtown ===
Newtown
Party	Candidate	Votes	%
Labour	Peter Shepherd	682	48.7%
Conservative	Graham Stone	225	16.1%
Liberal Democrats	David Barker-Hahlo	178	12.7%
Independent	George Williams	164	11.7%
Green	Adrian Thomas	151	10.8%
Majority		457	32.6%
Turnout			33.4%
Labour hold			

=== Pennsylvania ===
Pennsylvania
Party	Candidate	Votes	%
Liberal Democrats	Eleanor Hadley	838	41.1%
Conservative	Jeremy White	577	28.3%
Labour	Hilda Sterry	517	25.3%
Green	Margaret Hill	108	5.3%
Majority		261	12.8%
Turnout			48.1%
Liberal Democrats hold			

=== Pinhoe ===
Pinhoe
Party	Candidate	Votes	%
Labour	Gregory Sheldon	987	51.4%
Conservative	Reg Edwardson	663	34.5%
Liberal Democrats	Pauline Osterley	204	10.6%
Green	John Hayward	65	3.4%
Majority		324	16.9%
Turnout			41.8%
Labour hold			

=== Polsloe ===
Polsloe
Party	Candidate	Votes	%
Conservative	Yolonda Henson	631	39.5%
Labour	Dilys Baldwin	595	37.2%
Liberal Democrats	Sheila Hobden	185	11.6%
Green	Nicholas Discombe	156	9.8%
UKIP	David Challice	32	2.0%
Majority		36	2.3%
Turnout			33.9%
Labour hold			

=== Priory ===
Priory
Party	Candidate	Votes	%
Labour	Margaret Midgley	1,059	55.9%
Conservative	Stevie Bunting	371	19.6%
Liberal	Emma McCord	256	13.5%
Liberal Democrats	Maxwell Carrolle	155	8.2%
Green	Bryan	54	2.8%
Majority		688	36.3%
Turnout			29.7%
Labour hold			

=== St Davids ===
St Davids
Party	Candidate	Votes	%
Liberal Democrats	Stella Brock	757	57.7%
Labour	Bryan Steane	340	25.9%
Conservative	Richard Briggs	125	9.5%
Green	Andrew Alleway	91	6.9%
Majority		417	31.8%
Turnout			34.0%
Liberal Democrats hold			

=== Whipton & Barton ===
Whipton & Barton
Party	Candidate	Votes	%
Labour	Peter Edwards	1,083	53.4%
Liberal	Keith Danks	417	20.6%
Conservative	Andrew Leadbetter	339	16.7%
Liberal Democrats	Pamela Thickett	132	6.5%
Green	Richard Crompton	57	2.8%
Majority		666	32.8%
Turnout			34.9%
Labour hold			
