= 2010 Exeter City Council election =

2010 UK local government election

← 2008	9 September 2010	2011 →

14 of the 40 seats to Exeter City Council 21 seats needed for a majority
- Turnout: 28.44%
	First party	Second party
Party	Labour	Conservative
Last election	11	12
Seats before	13	12
Seats won	7	4
Seats after	15	11
Seat change	▲2	▼1
Popular vote	7,619	7,060
Percentage	35.3%	32.7%
	Third party	Fourth party
Party	Liberal Democrats	Liberal
Last election	13	4
Seats before	11	4
Seats won	3	0
Seats after	9	3
Seat change	Steady	▼1
Popular vote	4,333	348
Percentage	20.1%	1.6%
- Map showing the results of the 2010 Exeter City Council elections by ward. Red shows Labour seats, blue shows the Conservatives and yellow shows the Liberal Democrats. Wards in white had no election.
Council control before election
No overall control
Council control after election
No overall control

The 2010 Exeter City Council election took place on 9 September 2010 to elect members of Exeter City Council in England. One third of seats were up for election. The elections took place later in the year than other local elections. Exeter had previously been granted permission to become a unitary authority, with local elections postponed until 2011. When the Coalition Government won the general election earlier that year, Exeter's permission to form a unitary authority was overturned. Because of this, the High Court ruled that those councillors who had stayed on beyond their four-year term were no longer constitutionally elected, and would need to seek re-election. This resulted in there being an election in every ward in September to renew the mandate for the wards.

However, no election was needed in Pennsylvania ward, as a by-election had been held on 6 May, the day on which the local elections would ordinarily have taken place, to fill a vacancy for the seat that would have been due for re-election in 2010 in any case. Therefore, the winner of the May by-election was deemed to be elected to represent the ward for a full four-year term. The result of the May by-election is included in the results given.

== Background ==
The previous election in 2008 had left the council under no overall control with the Liberal Democrats as the largest party on 13 seats, followed by the Conservatives on 12, Labour on 11 and the Liberal Party on four. However, the week before the election, two Liberal Democrat councillors defected to Labour in protest against the party's coalition with the Conservatives. This meant that Labour were the largest party going into the election, on 13 seats to the Conservatives' 12 and the Liberal Democrats' 11.

== Results summary ==
2010 Exeter City Council election
Party	This election			Full council			This election		
Party	Seats	Net	Seats %	Other	Total	Total %	Votes	Votes %	+/−
Labour	7	▲2	50.0	8	15	37.5	7,741	35.9	+8.6
Conservative	4	▼1	28.6	7	11	27.5	7,060	32.7	-1.9
Liberal Democrats	3	Steady	21.4	8	11	27.5	4,364	20.2	-7.1
Liberal	0	▼1	0.0	3	3	7.5	348	1.6	-4.1
Green	0	Steady	0.0	0	0	0.0	1,302	6.0	+3.1
UKIP	0	Steady	0.0	0	0	0.0	696	3.2	+1.1
BNP	0	Steady	0.0	0	0	0.0	53	0.2	-4.1

== Ward results ==
=== Alphington ===
Alphington
Party	Candidate	Votes	%
Liberal Democrats	Rod Ruffle	719	43.6%
Conservative	David Thompson	515	31.2%
Green	Andrew Bell	293	17.8%
Labour	Andrew Dudgeon	122	7.4%
Majority		214	12.4%
Turnout		1,649	
Liberal Democrats hold			

=== Cowick ===
Cowick
Party	Candidate	Votes	%
Labour	Heather Morris	691	44.9%
Conservative	Connel Boyle	467	30.4%
Liberal Democrats	Cia Browning	269	17.5%
UKIP	Lawrence Harper	68	4.4%
Green	Arabella Fraser	43	2.8%
Majority		224	14.5%
Turnout		1,538	
Labour gain from Conservative			

=== Duryard ===
Duryard
Party	Candidate	Votes	%
Conservative	Lee Mottram	363	42.5%
Liberal Democrats	John Earle	351	41.1%
Labour	Jerry Fox	81	9.5%
Green	Lizzie Woodman	41	4.8%
UKIP	Peter Gove	19	2.2%
Majority		12	1.4%
Turnout		855	
Conservative gain from Liberal Democrats			

=== Exwick ===
Exwick
Party	Candidate	Votes	%
Labour	Rachel Sutton	909	52.4%
Liberal Democrats	Liam Martin	365	21.0%
Conservative	James Moffat	297	17.1%
UKIP	Richard Timmis	112	6.5%
Green	Isaac Price-Sosner	53	3.1%
Majority		544	31.4%
Turnout		1,736	
Labour hold			

=== Heavitree ===
Heavitree
Party	Candidate	Votes	%
Conservative	Tyna Crow	443	31.6%
Labour	Paul Bull	432	30.8%
Liberal	Christopher Gale	348	24.8%
Green	Susan Greenall	108	7.7%
Liberal Democrats	Paddy Elsdon	71	5.1%
Majority		11	0.8%
Turnout		1,402	
Conservative gain from Liberal			

=== Mincinglake & Whipton ===
Mincinglake & Whipton
Party	Candidate	Votes	%
Labour	Ian Martin	582	62.2%
Conservative	Jeremy White	162	17.3%
UKIP	Keith Crawford	86	9.2%
Liberal Democrats	Helen Bray	71	7.6%
Green	Ian Elliott	34	3.6%
Majority		420	44.9%
Turnout		935	
Labour hold			

=== Newtown ===
Newtown
Party	Candidate	Votes	%
Labour	Roger Spackman	569	49.3%
Conservative	Charlotte Markey	311	26.9%
Green	Tom Milburn	200	17.3%
Liberal Democrats	David Lockwood	75	6.5%
Majority		258	22.4%
Turnout		1,155	
Labour hold			

=== Pennsylvania ===
Pennsylvania
Party	Candidate	Votes	%
Liberal Democrats	Tim Payne	1,391	45.8%
Conservative	David Thompson	913	30.1%
Labour	Bernard Dugdale	491	16.2%
UKIP	David Smith	152	5.0%
Green	Isaac Price-Sosner	88	2.9%
Majority		478	15.7%
Turnout		3,035	
Liberal Democrats gain from Conservative			

=== Pinhoe ===
Pinhoe
Party	Candidate	Votes	%
Labour	Moira Macdonald	903	44.5%
Conservative	Ruth Smith	899	44.3%
Liberal Democrats	David Smith	104	5.1%
UKIP	Christine Fullam	74	3.6%
Green	Helen Edwards	48	2.4%
Majority		4	0.2%
Turnout		2,028	
Labour gain from Conservative			

=== Polsloe ===
Polsloe
Party	Candidate	Votes	%
Conservative	Yolonda Henson	589	46.0%
Labour	Rachel Lyons	477	37.3%
Liberal Democrats	Rouben Freeman	94	7.3%
Green	Christopher Townsend	93	7.3%
UKIP	Graham Down	27	2.1%
Majority		112	8.7%
Turnout		1,280	
Labour hold			

=== Priory ===
Priory
Party	Candidate	Votes	%
Labour	Lesley Robson	1,029	53.0%
Conservative	John Corcoran	634	32.7%
Liberal Democrats	Benjamin Noble	115	5.9%
Green	Keith Hyams	64	3.3%
BNP	Chris Stone	53	2.7%
UKIP	Dale Woolner	46	2.4%
Majority		395	20.3%
Turnout		1,941	
Labour hold			

=== St Davids ===
St Davids
Party	Candidate	Votes	%
Liberal Democrats	Stella Brock	385	45.0%
Labour	Ust Oldfield	201	23.5%
Conservative	Louis Ten-Holter	136	15.9%
Green	Mark Cox	94	11.0%
UKIP	Ralph Gay	39	4.6%
Majority		184	21.5%
Turnout		855	
Liberal Democrats hold			

=== Topsham ===
Topsham
Party	Candidate	Votes	%
Conservative	Margaret Baldwin	780	54.9%
Labour	Eliot Wright	276	19.4%
Liberal Democrats	Sandra Barrett	231	16.3%
UKIP	Mike Amor	73	5.1%
Green	Audaye Elesedy	61	4.3%
Majority		504	35.5%
Turnout		1,421	
Labour hold			

=== Whipton & Barton ===
Whipton & Barton
Party	Candidate	Votes	%
Labour	Peter Edwards	978	56.4%
Conservative	Andrew Leadbetter	551	31.8%
Liberal Democrats	Pamela Thickett	123	7.1%
Green	Jeff Ridley	82	4.7%
Majority		427	24.6%
Turnout		1,734	
Labour hold			
