= 2016 Exeter City Council election =

2016 UK local government election

← 2015	5 May 2016	2018 →

All 39 seats to Exeter City Council 20 seats needed for a majority
- Turnout: 39.14%
	First party	Second party	Third party
Party	Labour	Conservative	Liberal Democrats
Last election	29	10	1
Seats won	30	8	1
Seat change	▲1	▼2	Steady
Popular vote	15,912	9,884	5,050
Percentage	41.1%	25.5%	13.1%
- Map showing the results of the 2016 Exeter City Council elections by ward. Red shows Labour seats, blue shows the Conservatives, and yellow shows the Liberal Democrats. Striped wards indicate seats shared between parties.
Council control before election
Labour
Council control after election
Labour

The 2016 Exeter City Council election took place on 5 May 2016, to elect members of Exeter City Council in England. Following boundary changes, the entire council was up for election, and all 13 wards were contested, each electing three councillors. The election was held concurrently with other local elections held in England on the 5 May.

The council had been controlled by the Labour Party since 1990, which had held an outright majority since 2012. Labour won the Exeter election, extending their control to 30 seats, their highest ever share of the vote. The Conservatives came in second place with eight seats, losing four to Labour, while the Liberal Democrats won a single seat.

The election for the Devon and Cornwall Police and Crime Commissioner was also scheduled for the 5 May. Voters in Exeter would cast a separate ballot for the office, in conjunction with the residents of the rest of the Devon and Cornwall police area.

== Background ==
The elections to Exeter City Council were the first to be held since the Local Government Boundary Commission for England conducted a review into the electoral arrangements in Exeter. The review was prompted by the previous council that had a high level of electoral inequality, with some councillors representing many more voters than others. The old council consisted of 40 councillors from 18 wards, each of two or three councillors, which were elected by thirds over a four-year cycle, with elections to Devon County Council on the fourth year. This resulted in some wards having elections every year, while others would have one year in the cycle with no elections. The review resulted in the number of councillors being reduced to 39 and the number of wards reduced to 13, with each ward returning three councillors. The ward changes equalised the ratio of voters to councillors, and provided for the entire city being able to vote in local elections every year.

As a result of the review, for 2016 all seats on the council were up for election. The election used the plurality-at-large voting system; each voter was able to cast up to three votes, with the three candidates with the highest number of votes being elected. As the council would revert to electing by thirds in 2018, a number of councillors would serve partial terms in the interim. In each ward, the councillor who received the highest number of votes would serve a four-year term, the councillor with the second highest number a three-year term, and the councillor with the third-highest votes would have a two-year term. In future elections, each councillor would serve a full four-year term.

Before 5 May 2016 the council was controlled by the Labour Party which had held a majority on the council since the 2012 election, and had traditionally been the largest party in the city. After the previous election, which was held in 2015 for a third of the councillors, the council consisted of 29 Labour members, 10 Conservatives, and one Liberal Democrat.

Boundaries before

And after

== Campaign ==
A total of 138 candidates stood for election across the city. Four parties stood in every ward in the city, with both the Labour and Conservative parties putting up candidates for all 39 seats. The Green Party had the next highest number of candidates with 27, and the Liberal Democrats stood 20 candidates across the city. The UK Independence Party had 12 candidates standing in nine wards, and one person represented the Independence from Europe party.

The Labour Party were standing on their record in office and their key redevelopment plans for the former bus station, which would include the St Sidwell's Point leisure complex in the centre of the city. Labour also aimed to reduce traffic congestion, add a food waste collection, and reduce homelessness and the lack of affordable housing. The Conservatives campaigned against the St Sidwell's Point project on cost grounds, instead promising to invest in affordable housing, cultural venues, and producing a new transport plan for Exeter. The party aimed to improve on its low number of seats on the council. The Liberal Democrats planned to rebuild their former presence in Exeter, focusing on improving the quality of public services. The Green Party proposed a more environmentally sound city, focusing on improving the quality of life for residents, a sustainable development plan, and reducing waste from the city. They also planned to make the council more democratic and accountable to the people of Exeter. UKIP had a national plan for local councils, which included devolution of power to local authorities, attempting to end funding and projects from the European Union and prioritising locals in service provision.

== Results ==
The election was won by the Labour Party, who won 30 of the 39 seats on the council. The Conservative Party came second, winning eight seats, and the Liberal Democrats had one councillor elected. The overall turnout was 39.14%. Labour extended its majority to 10 councillors – the party's largest ever majority on the council – by gaining three seats from the Conservatives. Labour won all three seats in eight wards, and won at least one seat in every ward except the suburban Topsham, won by the Conservatives. The Conservatives also won five other seats across the city. One ward, Duryard & St James, was split three ways between the parties.

2016 Exeter City Council election
Party	This election			Full council			This election		
Party	Seats	Net	Seats %	Other	Total	Total %	Votes	Votes %	+/−
Labour	30	▲1	76.9	0	30	76.9	43,905	47.5	+11.1
Conservative	8	▼2	20.5	0	8	20.5	26,797	29.0	-4.1
Liberal Democrats	1	Steady	2.6	0	1	2.6	8,629	9.3	-1.5
Green	0	Steady	0.0	0	0	0.0	8,868	9.6	+0.3
UKIP	0	Steady	0.0	0	0	0.0	4,036	4.4	-5.6
Independence from Europe	0	Steady	0.0	0	0	0.0	104	0.1	New

== Ward results ==
An asterisk (*) denotes an incumbent councillor seeking re-election.

=== Alphington ===
Alphington
Party	Candidate	Votes	%
Labour	Steve Warwick	1,096	41.0
Labour	Chris Musgrave	1,063	39.8
Labour	Bob Foale	1,044	39.1
Conservative	John Harvey*	982	36.8
Conservative	Emily Croft	807	30.2
Conservative	Aric Gilinsky	669	25.0
UKIP	Robert Ball	349	13.1
UKIP	Dutch Dudgeon	331	12.4
Liberal Democrats	Rod Ruffle	312	11.7
Green	Andrew Wallace Bell	259	9.7
Green	Audaye Khalid Elesedy	157	5.9
Green	Isabel Castle	154	5.8
Registered electors		6,375	
Turnout		2,672	41.91%

=== Duryard & St James ===
Duryard & St James
Party	Candidate	Votes	%
Labour	Keith Owen*	851	34.9
Conservative	Percy Prowse*	773	31.7
Liberal Democrats	Kevin John Mitchell	770	31.5
Labour	Tristan Charles Leonard Harris	720	29.5
Labour	Robin Edward William Hughes-Chamberlain	674	27.6
Conservative	Richard William Elliott	601	24.6
Liberal Democrats	Michael Norman Mitchell	583	23.9
Conservative	Lee William Mottram*	561	23.0
Liberal Democrats	Nicholas George Sutton	458	18.8
Green	Bethany Payne	303	12.4
Green	Rouben Scott Freeman	253	10.4
Green	Jenny Steer	245	10.0
UKIP	Sallie Cherie Waters	141	5.8
Registered electors		6,848	
Turnout		2,441	35.65%

=== Exwick ===
Exwick
Party	Candidate	Votes	%
Labour	Philip Michael Bialyk*	1,362	57.6
Labour	Ollie Pearson*	1,277	54.0
Labour	Rachel Helen Sutton*	1,245	52.7
UKIP	Lawrence Simon Harper	473	20.0
Conservative	Steve Hawkins	462	19.6
Conservative	Benjamin Tomos Lewis	394	16.7
Conservative	Patricia White	362	15.3
Green	Stephen Leslie Porter	309	13.1
Liberal Democrats	Caroline Emily Gwyneth Nottle	268	11.3
Registered electors		7,197	
Turnout		2,363	32.83%

=== Heavitree ===
Heavitree
Party	Candidate	Votes	%
Labour	Olwen Margaret Foggin*	1,677	55.3
Labour	Rosie Clare Denham*	1,653	54.6
Labour	Greg Sheldon*	1,394	46.0
Conservative	Guy Steven Frank Richards	620	20.5
Green	Gill Baker	607	20.0
Conservative	Azhar-Jamal Chaudhry	560	18.5
Conservative	Sam Morfey	558	18.4
UKIP	Diana Beasley	336	11.1
Liberal Democrats	Sheila Muriel Hobden	305	10.1
Green	Steve Jones	297	9.8
Green	Rob Davies	262	8.6
Registered electors		6,783	
Turnout		3,030	44.67%

=== Mincinglake & Whipton ===
Mincinglake & Whipton
Party	Candidate	Votes	%
Labour	Emma Anita Morse*	1,337	55.8
Labour	Peter William Edwards*	1,209	50.5
Labour	Stephen Alexander Brimble*	1,183	49.4
UKIP	Alison Jane Sheridan	472	19.7
UKIP	Anne Patricia Back	418	17.5
Conservative	David Thompson	397	16.6
Conservative	George Thomas Livesey	372	15.5
UKIP	Eddie Higgins	367	15.3
Conservative	Paul Robert Geoffrey Rota	339	14.2
Green	Bridget Catherine Oliver	218	9.1
Liberal Democrats	Andrew Matthew Soper	167	7.0
Registered electors		6,688	
Turnout		2,394	35.80%

=== Newtown & St Leonards ===
Newtown & St Leonards
Party	Candidate	Votes	%
Labour	Richard Arthur Branston*	1,725	57.0
Labour	Natalie Jane Vizard*	1,562	51.6
Labour	Roger David Spackman*	1,448	47.8
Conservative	Norman Shiel	816	26.9
Conservative	John Murphy	755	24.9
Conservative	Stephanie Warner	676	22.3
Green	Tom Milburn	416	13.7
Green	Andrew Cheesewright	371	12.3
Green	Joe Powell	276	9.1
Liberal Democrats	James Landymore	244	8.1
UKIP	Jacqueline Barbara Holdstock	172	5.7
Independence from Europe	Dave Smith	104	3.4
Registered electors		6,893	
Turnout		3,028	43.93%

=== Pennsylvania ===
Pennsylvania
Party	Candidate	Votes	%
Labour	Rachel Clare Lyons*	1,307	41.3
Labour	Daniel Ryan Gottschalk	1,254	39.6
Conservative	Peter Holland*	1,196	37.8
Labour	Christine Elizabeth Raybould-Gooding	1,146	36.2
Conservative	Alan Jones	1,094	34.6
Conservative	Anne Jobson	1,092	34.5
Green	Lizzie Woodman	538	17.0
Green	David Barker-Hahlo	450	14.2
Green	Alysa Freeman	409	12.9
Liberal Democrats	Kimberley Lauren Stansfield	309	9.8
Registered electors		7,514	
Turnout		3,166	42.13%

=== Pinhoe ===
Pinhoe
Party	Candidate	Votes	%
Labour	David James Harvey	1,046	45.5
Conservative	Cynthia Thompson	981	42.7
Labour	Duncan Wood	953	41.4
Conservative	Ruth Smith	926	40.3
Conservative	John Rogers	894	38.9
Labour	Laura Charis Adelaide Wright	869	37.8
Green	Diana Patricia Jones	224	9.7
Liberal Democrats	Mike Payne	163	7.1
Registered electors		5,052	
Turnout		2,300	45.53%

=== Priory ===
Priory
Party	Candidate	Votes	%
Labour	Kate Hannan*	1,372	56.5
Labour	Lesley Sara Robson*	1,207	49.7
Labour	Tony Wardle*	1,141	47.0
Conservative	Lucille Baker	601	24.8
Conservative	Nicola Guagliardo	537	22.1
Conservative	Mario Trabucco	517	21.3
UKIP	Robert James Sheridan	337	13.9
Green	Lynn Susan Wetenhall	301	12.4
Liberal Democrats	Ellen McDonnell	215	8.9
Registered electors		6,256	
Turnout		2,428	38.81%

=== St Davids ===
St Davids
Party	Candidate	Votes	%
Labour	Robert Lamb	1,063	40.3
Labour	Lewis Peter Griffiths Keen	1,002	38.0
Labour	Luke Sean Sills	875	33.2
Liberal Democrats	Stella Rose Brock*	768	29.1
Green	Diana Frances Moore	655	24.8
Liberal Democrats	Philip John Brock	612	23.2
Liberal Democrats	Kevin Martin Chun	526	19.9
Conservative	Catherine Pierce	473	17.9
Conservative	Louis Ten-Holter	453	17.2
Conservative	Jeremy White	438	16.6
Green	Kay Powell	413	15.7
Green	Mark Shorto	321	12.2
Registered electors		6,981	
Turnout		2,637	37.77%

=== St Loyes ===
St Loyes
Party	Candidate	Votes	%
Conservative	David John Henson*	923	44.7
Conservative	Yolonda Anne Cullis Henson	901	43.6
Labour	Rose Leinwen Ashford	692	33.5
Conservative	James Ali Taghdissian	616	29.8
Labour	Calum Gabriel John Craig	581	28.1
Labour	David Charles Coughlin	549	26.6
UKIP	Valerie Angus	333	16.1
Green	Ben Head	306	14.8
Liberal Democrats	David William Roberts	304	14.7
Registered electors		6,597	
Turnout		2,066	31.32%

=== St Thomas ===
St Thomas
Party	Candidate	Votes	%
Labour	Rob Hannaford*	1,502	49.8
Labour	Hannah Louise Packham*	1,314	43.6
Labour	Paul David Bull*	1,219	40.4
Liberal Democrats	Adrian Alan Fullam	978	32.4
Liberal Democrats	Vanessa Newcombe	730	24.2
Liberal Democrats	Sandy Chenore	670	22.2
Conservative	Charles Arthur Michael Beaty	383	12.7
UKIP	Brian Jeffrey	307	10.2
Green	Samuel Charles Bolitho	260	8.6
Conservative	Elliott Latif Malik	258	8.6
Green	Joe Levy	241	8.0
Conservative	Nabila Roukhamieh-Mckinna	210	7.0
Green	Cheryl Jacqueline Freeman	203	6.7
Registered electors		7,329	
Turnout		3,017	41.17%

=== Topsham ===
Topsham
Party	Candidate	Votes	%
Conservative	Andrew Robert Leadbetter*	1,277	52.1
Conservative	Rob Newby*	1,188	48.4
Conservative	Margaret Anne Baldwin*	1,135	46.3
Labour	Eliot Paul Wright	882	36.0
Labour	Elizabeth Oxburgh	736	30.0
Labour	Tom Stephenson	635	25.9
Green	John Moreman	420	17.1
Liberal Democrats	William Vasey	247	10.1
Registered electors		6,334	
Turnout		2,453	38.73%
