= 2018 Exeter City Council election =

2018 UK local government election

← 2016	3 May 2018	2019 →

13 of 39 seats (One Third) to Exeter City Council 20 seats needed for a majority
	First party	Second party
Party	Labour	Conservative
Last election	30	8
Seats before	29	8
Seats won	10	2
Seats after	29	8
Seat change	Steady	Steady
Popular vote	15,325	10,557
Percentage	47.3%	32.6%
	Third party	Fourth party
Party	Liberal Democrats	Green
Last election	1	0
Seats before	1	1
Seats won	1	0
Seats after	1	1
Seat change	Steady	Steady
Popular vote	3,005	3,423
Percentage	9.3%	10.6%
- Map showing the results of the 2018 Exeter City Council elections by ward. Red shows Labour seats, blue shows the Conservatives, and yellow shows the Liberal Democrats.

The 2018 Exeter City Council election took place on 3 May 2018 to elect a third (13/39) of the members of Exeter City Council in England. This was on the same day as other local elections. The election result left the council with the same political make up as it had before the election, with Labour in control with 29 seats and the Conservatives as the main opposition party, returning with 8.

== Background ==
At the previous election in 2016 election, Labour remained in control of the council with 30 councillors out of 39. In February 2017, Labour Councillor Chris Musgrave defected to the Green Party, leaving them with 29 seats going into the election.

== Results summary ==
2018 Exeter City Council election
Party	This election			Full council			This election		
Party	Seats	Net	Seats %	Other	Total	Total %	Votes	Votes %	+/−
Labour	10	Steady	76.9	19	29	74.4	15,325	47.3	-0.2
Conservative	2	Steady	15.4	6	8	20.5	10,557	32.6	+3.6
Liberal Democrats	1	Steady	7.7	0	1	2.6	3,005	9.3	±0.0
Green	0	Steady	0.0	1	1	2.6	3,423	10.6	+1.0
Women's Equality	0	Steady	0.0	0	0	0.0	75	0.2	New
BNP	0	Steady	0.0	0	0	0.0	34	0.1	New
Democrats and Veterans	0	Steady	0.0	0	0	0.0	10	>0.1	New

== Council composition ==
After the previous election, the composition of the council was:

↓
30	8	1
Labour	Conservative	LD

Before this election, the composition of the council was:

↓
29	8	1	1
Labour	Conservative	LD	G

After this election, the composition of the council was:

↓
29	8	1	1
Labour	Conservative	LD	G

== Results by ward ==
(*) Asterisk denotes the sitting councillor.

=== Alphington ===
Alphington
Party	Candidate	Votes	%	±%
Labour	Bob Foale*	1,029	42.77	+3.7
Conservative	Katherine New	933	38.78	+2.0
Green	Andrew Bell	256	10.64	+0.9
Liberal Democrats	Rod Ruffle	188	7.81	−3.9
Majority		96	3.99%	
Turnout		2,406	36.77%	
Labour hold		Swing		

=== Duryard & St James ===
Duryard & St James
Party	Candidate	Votes	%	±%
Liberal Democrats	Kevin Mitchell*	783	34.60	+3.1
Labour	Charlie Davies	722	31.90	+2.4
Conservative	John Harvey	541	23.91	−0.7
Green	Bethany Payne	132	5.83	−6.6
Women's Equality	Bea Gare	75	3.31	N/A
Democrats and Veterans	Sallie Waters	10	0.44	N/A
Majority		61		
Turnout		2,263	33.49	
Liberal Democrats hold		Swing		

=== Exwick ===
Exwick
Party	Candidate	Votes	%	±%
Labour	Rachel Sutton*	1,278	57.80	+5.1
Conservative	Elliott Malik	593	26.82	+7.2
Green	Mark Shorto	200	9.05	−4.0
Liberal Democrats	Andrew Soper	140	6.33	−5.0
Majority		685		
Turnout		2,211	30.18	
Labour hold		Swing		

=== Heavitree ===
Heavitree
Party	Candidate	Votes	%	±%
Labour	Greg Sheldon*	1,554	53.75	+7.8
Conservative	Guy Richards	786	27.19	+6.7
Green	Gill Baker	345	11.93	−8.1
Liberal Democrats	Stephen Gates	206	7.13	−3.0
Majority		768		
Turnout		2,891	42.21	
Labour hold		Swing		

=== Mincinglake & Whipton ===
Mincinglake & Whipton
Party	Candidate	Votes	%	±%
Labour	Judy Pattison	1,203	58.45	+9.1
Conservative	George Livesey	603	29.30	+13.8
Green	Kayleigh Powell	129	6.27	−2.8
Liberal Democrats	Matt Smith	123	5.98	−1.0
Majority		600		
Turnout		2,058	30.98	
Labour hold		Swing		

=== Newtown & St Leonards ===
Newtown & St Leonards
Party	Candidate	Votes	%	±%
Labour	Matthew Vizard*	1,447	56.13	+8.3
Conservative	Ian Watt	628	24.36	−2.5
Green	Tom Milburn	267	10.36	−3.3
Liberal Democrats	Alexandra Newcombe	236	9.15	+1.1
Majority		819		
Turnout		2,578	36.08	
Labour hold		Swing		

=== Pennsylvania ===
Pennsylvania
Party	Candidate	Votes	%	±%
Labour	Jane Begley	1,435	47.95	+11.8
Conservative	David Smith	1,062	35.48	−2.3
Green	Lizzie Woodman	324	10.83	−6.2
Liberal Democrats	Michael Mitchell	172	5.75	−4.0
Majority		373		
Turnout		2,993	39.42	
Labour gain from Conservative		Swing		

=== Pinhoe ===
Pinhoe
Party	Candidate	Votes	%	±%
Labour	Duncan Wood*	1,128	47.08	+5.7
Conservative	Keith Sparkes	1,057	44.12	+3.8
Green	Diana Jones	114	4.76	−4.9
Liberal Democrats	Charles Cole	97	4.05	−3.0
Majority		71		
Turnout		2,396	41.04	
Labour hold		Swing		

=== Priory ===
Priory
Party	Candidate	Votes	%	±%
Labour	Tony Wardle*	1,177	52.90	+5.9
Conservative	Jago Brockway	651	29.26	+4.5
Green	Lynn Wetenhall	220	9.89	−2.5
Liberal Democrats	Christine Campion	177	7.96	−0.9
Majority		526		
Turnout		2,225	34.25	
Labour hold		Swing		

=== St Davids ===
St Davids
Party	Candidate	Votes	%	±%
Labour	Luke Sills*	1,119	43.41	+10.2
Green	Diana Moore	826	32.04	+7.2
Conservative	Aric Gilinsky	471	18.27	+0.4
Liberal Democrats	James Dart	162	6.28	−22.8
Majority		293		
Turnout		2,578	35.09	
Labour hold		Swing		

=== St Loyes ===
St Loyes
Party	Candidate	Votes	%	±%
Conservative	Peter Holland	1,299	52.23	+22.4
Labour	Christine Buswell	901	36.23	+2.7
Liberal Democrats	Thomas Deakin	167	6.71	−8.0
Green	Andrew Cheesewright	120	4.83	−10.0
Majority		398		
Turnout		2,487	36.03	
Conservative gain from Labour		Swing		

=== St Thomas ===
St Thomas
Party	Candidate	Votes	%	±%
Labour	Laura Wright	1,343	49.30	+8.9
Conservative	Mason Bell	679	24.93	+12.2
Liberal Democrats	Sandy Chenore	376	13.80	−8.4
Green	Joe Levy	292	10.72	+2.7
BNP	Chris Stone	34	1.25	N/A
Majority		664		
Turnout		2,724	36.75	
Labour hold		Swing		

=== Topsham ===
Topsham
Party	Candidate	Votes	%	±%
Conservative	Catherine Pierce	1,254	47.88	+1.6
Labour	Eliot Wright	989	37.76	+1.8
Green	Jonathan Dawson	198	7.56	−9.5
Liberal Democrats	David Pugh	178	6.80	−3.3
Majority		265		
Turnout		2,619	37.77	
Conservative hold		Swing		
