= 2003 Exeter City Council election =

2003 UK local government election

← 2002	1 May 2003	2004 →

14 of the 40 seats to Exeter City Council 21 seats needed for a majority
- Turnout: 35.6%
	First party	Second party
Party	Labour	Liberal Democrats
Last election	22	8
Seats won	5	4
Seats after	20	10
Seat change	▼2	▲2
Popular vote	7,016	5,306
Percentage	32.2%	24.3%
	Third party	Fourth party
Party	Conservative	Liberal
Last election	6	4
Seats won	2	2
Seats after	6	4
Seat change	Steady	Steady
Popular vote	5,778	2,348
Percentage	26.5%	10.8%
- Map showing the results of the 2003 Exeter City Council elections by ward. Red shows Labour seats, blue shows the Conservatives, yellow shows the Liberal Democrats and orange shows the Liberals. Wards in grey had no election.
Council control before election
Labour
Council control after election
No overall control

The 2003 Exeter City Council election took place on 1 May 2003, to elect members of Exeter City Council in Devon, England. The election was held concurrently with other local elections in England. One third of the council was up for election and the Labour Party lost control of the council, which it had held since 1995.

== Results summary ==
2003 Exeter City Council election
Party	This election			Full council			This election		
Party	Seats	Net	Seats %	Other	Total	Total %	Votes	Votes %	+/−
Labour	5	▼2	38.5	15	20	50.0	7,016	32.6	-7.0
Liberal Democrats	4	▲2	30.8	6	10	25.0	5,306	24.6	+2.7
Conservative	2	Steady	15.4	4	6	15.0	5,778	26.8	+2.7
Liberal	2	Steady	15.4	2	4	10.0	2,103	9.8	+2.4
Green	0	Steady	0.0	0	0	0.0	791	3.7	-2.2
Independent	0	Steady	0.0	0	0	0.0	324	1.5	+0.7
UKIP	0	Steady	0.0	0	0	0.0	164	0.8	+0.4
Socialist Alternative	0	Steady	0.0	0	0	0.0	67	0.3	N/A

== Ward results ==
=== Alphington ===
Alphington
Party	Candidate	Votes	%
Liberal Democrats	Peter Wadham	1,229	54.5%
Conservative	Peter Cox	628	27.8%
Labour	Celia Morrish	398	17.6%
Majority		601	26.7%
Turnout		2,255	
Liberal Democrats hold			

=== Cowick ===
Cowick
Party	Candidate	Votes	%
Labour	Michael Mills	701	42.5%
Conservative	Margaret Baldwin	626	38.0%
Liberal Democrats	Rodney Ruffle	196	11.9%
UKIP	David Challice	77	4.7%
Green	John Hayward	49	3.0%
Majority		75	4.5%
Turnout		1,649	
Labour hold			

=== Duryard ===
Duryard
Party	Candidate	Votes	%
Liberal Democrats	Cherry Luxton	553	47.6%
Conservative	Graham Stone	380	32.7%
Labour	Dominic O'Brien	125	10.8%
Green	Suzanne Dunstan	103	8.9%
Majority		173	14.9%
Turnout		1,161	
Liberal Democrats hold			

=== Exwick ===
Exwick
Party	Candidate	Votes	%
Labour	Roy Slack	843	47.8%
Independent	David Mashiter	260	14.7%
Conservative	Daniel Bower	253	14.4%
Liberal Democrats	Paul Pettinger	240	13.6%
UKIP	Lawrence Harper	87	4.9%
Green	Thomas Chant	80	4.5%
Majority		583	33.1%
Turnout		1,763	
Labour hold			

=== Heavitree ===
Heavitree
Party	Candidate	Votes	%
Liberal	David Morrish	1,176	67.7%
Labour	Ian Martin	272	15.7%
Conservative	Jonathan Farquharson	194	11.2%
Liberal Democrats	Pamela Thickett	95	5.5%
Majority		904	52.0%
Turnout		1,737	
Liberal hold			

=== Mincinglake ===
Mincinglake & Whipton
Party	Candidate	Votes	%
Labour	Dilys Baldwin	566	53.5%
Conservative	Richard Briggs	246	23.3%
Liberal Democrats	Andrew Soper	175	16.6%
Green	Alison Raddon	42	4.0%
Socialist Alternative	Peter Sloman	28	2.6%
Majority		320	30.3%
Turnout		1,057	
Labour hold			

=== Priory ===
Priory
Party	Candidate	Votes	%
Labour	Mark Baldwin	1,007	55.4%
Conservative	Iris Newby	467	25.7%
Liberal Democrats	Maxwell Carrolle	345	19.0%
Majority		540	29.7%
Turnout		1,819	
Labour hold			

=== St James ===
St Davids
Party	Candidate	Votes	%
Liberal Democrats	Kevin Mitchell	532	39.5%
Labour	Marcel Choules	483	35.9%
Conservative	Alexander Barahona	170	12.6%
Green	Anita Sutcliffe	162	12.0%
Majority		49	3.6%
Turnout		1,347	
Liberal Democrats gain from Labour			

=== St Leonards ===
St Leonards
Party	Candidate	Votes	%
Conservative	John Winterbottom	873	48.5%
Labour	Eileen Digweed	515	28.6%
Liberal Democrats	Sheila Hobden	199	11.1%
Green	Nicholas Discombe	149	8.3%
Independent	Terence Griffin	64	3.6%
Majority		358	19.9%
Turnout		1,800	
Conservative hold			

=== St Loyes ===
St Loyes
Party	Candidate	Votes	%
Liberal	Margaret Danks	749	59.9%
Conservative	Emily Dover	223	17.8%
Labour	Christine Buswell	207	16.5%
Liberal Democrats	Thomas Revesz	72	5.8%
Majority		526	42.0%
Turnout		1,251	
Liberal hold			

=== St Thomas ===
St Thomas
Party	Candidate	Votes	%
Liberal Democrats	Adrian Fullam	1,108	54.8%
Labour	Connel Boyle	660	32.6%
Conservative	Gerald Sclater	179	8.8%
Green	Paul Edwards	76	3.8%
Majority		448	22.1%
Turnout		2,023	
Liberal Democrats gain from Labour			

=== Topsham ===
Topsham
Party	Candidate	Votes	%
Conservative	Robert Bewby	1,199	59.8%
Liberal Democrats	John Bryant	384	19.1%
Labour	Michael Groves	293	14.6%
Green	Joyce Barkla	130	6.5%
Majority		815	40.6%
Turnout		2,006	
Conservative hold			

=== Whipton & Barton ===
Whipton & Barton
Party	Candidate	Votes	%
Labour	Hilda Sterry	946	49.1%
Liberal	Keith Danks	423	22.0%
Conservative	Keith Nelson-Tomsen	340	17.7%
Liberal Democrats	Pauline Osterly	178	9.2%
Socialist Alternative	Elizabeth Allnatt	39	2.0%
Majority		523	27.1%
Turnout		1,926	
Labour hold			
