= 2008 Exeter City Council election =

2008 UK local government election

- 1 May 2008

14 of the 40 seats to Exeter City Council 21 seats needed for a majority
- Turnout: 37.9%
	First party	Second party
Party	Liberal Democrats	Conservative
Last election	12	10
Seats won	6	4
Seats after	13	12
Seat change	▲1	▲2
Popular vote	6,850	8,793
Percentage	27.0%	34.6%
	Third party	Fourth party
Party	Labour	Liberal
Last election	14	4
Seats won	3	1
Seats after	11	4
Seat change	▼3	Steady
Popular vote	6,954	1,515
Percentage	27.4%	6.0%
- Map showing the results of the 2008 Exeter City Council elections by ward. Red shows Labour seats, blue shows the Conservatives, yellow shows the Liberal Democrats and orange shows the Liberals. Wards in white had no election.
Council control before election
No overall control
Council control after election
No overall control

The 2008 Exeter City Council election took place on 1 May 2008, to elect members of Exeter City Council in Devon, England. The election was held concurrently with other local elections in England. One third of the council was up for election and the council remained under no overall control.

== Results summary ==
2008 Exeter City Council election
Party	This election			Full council			This election		
Party	Seats	Net	Seats %	Other	Total	Total %	Votes	Votes %	+/−
Liberal Democrats	6	▲1	42.9	7	13	32.5	6,923	27.3	+0.4
Conservative	4	▲2	28.6	8	12	30.0	8,793	34.6	+4.6
Labour	3	▼3	21.4	8	11	27.5	6,942	27.3	±0.0
Liberal	1	Steady	7.1	3	4	10.0	1,454	5.7	-4.5
Green	0	Steady	0.0	0	0	0.0	747	2.9	-0.8
UKIP	0	Steady	0.0	0	0	0.0	529	2.1	+0.2

== Ward results ==
=== Alphington ===
Alphington
Party	Candidate	Votes	%
Liberal Democrats	Alexandra Newcombe	911	39.0%
Conservative	Margaret Jordan	836	35.8%
Labour	Brett Crane	265	11.3%
UKIP	Laura Moralee	174	7.4%
Green	Andrew Bell	152	6.5%
Majority		75	3.2%
Turnout		2,338	
Liberal Democrats hold			

=== Exwick ===
Exwick
Party	Candidate	Votes	%
Liberal Democrats	Adrian Hannaford	907	38.8%
Labour	Hazel Slack	887	38.0%
Conservative	James Moffat	384	16.4%
UKIP	Richard Timmis	158	6.8%
Majority		20	0.9%
Turnout		2,336	
Liberal Democrats gain from Labour			

=== Newtown ===
Newtown
Party	Candidate	Votes	%
Labour	Richard Branston	730	54.7%
Conservative	Dale Woolner	269	20.1%
Liberal Democrats	Geoffrey Pettinger	200	15.0%
Green	Susannah Cornwall	136	10.2%
Majority		461	34.5%
Turnout		1,335	
Labour hold			

=== Pennsylvania ===
Pennsylvania
Party	Candidate	Votes	%
Liberal Democrats	Sheila Hobden	894	45.0%
Conservative	Gabriella Dudley	792	39.9%
Labour	Andrew Dean	203	10.2%
Green	Peter Gove	96	4.8%
Majority		102	5.1%
Turnout		1,985	
Liberal Democrats hold			

=== Pinhoe ===
Pinhoe
Party	Candidate	Votes	%
Conservative	Cynthia Thompson	993	43.8%
Labour	Valerie Dixon	910	40.2%
Liberal Democrats	Rodney Northcott	212	9.4%
Liberal	Tessa Barrett	151	6.7%
Majority		83	3.7%
Turnout		2,266	
Conservative gain from Labour			

=== Polsloe ===
Polsloe
Party	Candidate	Votes	%
Conservative	James Taghdissian	672	43.6%
Labour	Rachel Lyons	567	36.8%
Liberal Democrats	Larissa Rowe	301	19.5%
Majority		105	6.8%
Turnout		1,540	
Conservative gain from Labour			

=== Priory ===
Priory
Party	Candidate	Votes	%
Labour	Marcel Choules	1,009	46.2%
Conservative	Lesley Luke	715	32.7%
Liberal Democrats	Sandra Barrett	364	16.7%
Liberal	Keith Danks	98	4.5%
Majority		294	13.5%
Turnout		2,186	
Labour hold			

=== St Davids ===
St Davids
Party	Candidate	Votes	%
Liberal Democrats	Philip Brock	613	52.6%
Conservative	Benjamin Corbridge	248	21.3%
Labour	Philip Thomas	227	19.5%
UKIP	Keith Crawford	77	6.6%
Majority		365	31.3%
Turnout		1,165	
Liberal Democrats hold			

=== St James ===
St James
Party	Candidate	Votes	%
Liberal Democrats	Natalie Cole	531	39.4%
Labour	Paul Bull	384	28.5%
Conservative	Tarasyn Whitehead-Patey	216	16.0%
Green	Isaac Price-Sosner	174	12.9%
UKIP	Michael Wilcox	43	3.2%
Majority		147	10.9%
Turnout		1,348	
Liberal Democrats hold			

=== St Leonards ===
St Leonards
Party	Candidate	Votes	%
Conservative	Norman Shiel	935	57.2%
Liberal Democrats	Jerry Fox	261	16.0%
Labour	Pamela Holman	249	15.2%
Green	Adrian Worthley	189	11.6%
Majority		674	41.2%
Turnout		1,634	
Conservative hold			

=== St Loyes ===
St Loyes
Party	Candidate	Votes	%
Liberal	Joan Morrish	917	53.8%
Conservative	David Henson	582	34.2%
Labour	George Sterry	121	7.1%
Liberal Democrats	Ruairi Fullam	84	4.9%
Majority		335	19.6%
Turnout		1,704	
Liberal hold			

=== St Thomas ===
St Thomas
Party	Candidate	Votes	%
Liberal Democrats	Robert Hannaford	958	61.5%
Labour	Richard Harris	314	20.2%
Conservative	Patricia White	208	13.4%
UKIP	Alison Timmis	77	4.9%
Majority		644	41.3%
Turnout		1,557	
Liberal Democrats gain from Labour			

=== Topsham ===
Topsham
Party	Candidate	Votes	%
Conservative	William Starling	1,284	63.8%
Liberal Democrats	Nigel Williams	428	21.3%
Labour	Rachel Sutton	302	15.0%
Majority		856	42.5%
Turnout		2,014	
Conservative hold			

=== Whipton & Barton ===
Whipton & Barton
Party	Candidate	Votes	%
Labour	Anthony Wardle	774	39.1%
Conservative	Jeremy White	659	33.3%
Liberal	Nigel Harry	288	14.5%
Liberal Democrats	Pamela Thickett	259	13.1%
Majority		115	5.8%
Turnout		1,980	
Labour hold			
