= 2014 Exeter City Council election =

2014 UK local government election

- 22 May 2014

13 of the 40 seats to Exeter City Council 21 seats needed for a majority
	First party	Second party	Third party
Party	Labour	Conservative	Liberal Democrats
Seats won	10	2	1
Seats after	27	10	3
Seat change	▲3	▼1	▼2
Popular vote	9,859	6,492	3,769
Percentage	37.8%	24.9%	14.5%
- Map showing the results of the 2014 Exeter City Council elections by ward. Red shows Labour seats, blue shows the Conservatives and yellow shows the Liberal Democrats. Wards in grey had no election.
Council control before election
Labour
Council control after election
Labour

The 2014 Exeter City Council election took place on 22 May 2014, to elect members of Exeter City Council in Exeter, Devon, England. This was on the same day as other local elections.

== Results summary ==
2014 Exeter City Council election
Party	This election			Full council			This election		
Party	Seats	Net	Seats %	Other	Total	Total %	Votes	Votes %	+/−
Labour	9	▲2	69.2	18	27	67.5	10,657	37.8	-6.3
Conservative	3	Steady	23.1	7	10	25.0	7,260	25.7	-0.8
Liberal Democrats	1	▼2	7.7	1	2	5.0	2,762	9.8	-4.2
Liberal	0	Steady	0.0	1	1	2.5	0	0.0	±0.0
UKIP	0	Steady	0.0	0	0	0.0	4,152	14.7	+8.7
Green	0	Steady	0.0	0	0	0.0	2,865	10.2	+2.3
TUSC	0	Steady	0.0	0	0	0.0	256	0.9	N/A
Independence from Europe	0	Steady	0.0	0	0	0.0	172	0.6	N/A
Left Unity	0	Steady	0.0	0	0	0.0	39	0.1	N/A
BNP	0	Steady	0.0	0	0	0.0	38	0.1	N/A

== Results by ward ==
=== Alphington ===
Alphington
Party	Candidate	Votes	%	±%
Labour	Suaad George	808	31.5%	
Conservative	Peter Cox	583	22.7%	
UKIP	Andrew Dudgeon	529	20.6%	
Liberal Democrats	Rodney Ruffle	384	15.0%	
Green	Diana Moore	261	10.2%	
Majority		225	8.8%	
Turnout		2,576	38.48%	
Conservative gain from Liberal Democrats		Swing		

=== Cowick ===
Cowick
Party	Candidate	Votes	%	±%
Labour	Heather Morris	813	44.0%	
UKIP	Peter Boardman	406	22.0%	
Conservative	Louis Ten-Holter	400	21.7%	
Liberal Democrats	Philip Brock	121	6.6%	
Green	Therese Canning	94	5.1%	
TUSC	Lily Cooper	12	0.7%	
Majority		407	22.0%	
Turnout		1,849	41.71%	
Labour hold		Swing		

=== Duryard & St James ===
Duryard & St James
Party	Candidate	Votes	%	±%
Conservative	Lee Mottram	796	47.8%	
Labour	John Chilvers	338	20.3%	
Green	David Barker-Hahlo	330	19.8%	
Liberal Democrats	Nigel Williams	173	10.4%	
TUSC	James Golten	28	1.7%	
Majority		458	27.5%	
Turnout		1,677	30.93%	
Conservative hold		Swing		

=== Exwick ===
Exwick
Party	Candidate	Votes	%	±%
Labour	Rachel Sutton	1,893	43.8%	
UKIP	Rick Timmis	1,201	27.8%	
Conservative	Ruth Smith	646	15.0%	
Green	Mark Shorto	339	7.9%	
Liberal Democrats	Stephen Barnes	211	4.9%	
TUSC	Andrew Duncan	27	0.6%	
Majority		692	16.0%	
Turnout		2,177	33.78%	
Labour hold		Swing		

=== Heavitree ===
Heavitree
Party	Candidate	Votes	%	±%
Labour	Olwen Foggin	897	44.3%	
Conservative	Aric Gilinsky	483	23.9%	
Green	Deborah Frayne	284	14.0%	
Liberal Democrats	Christopher Townsend	219	10.8%	
Independence from Europe	David Smith	121	6.0%	
TUSC	Samuel Taylor-Wickenden	20	1.0%	
Majority		414	20.5%	
Turnout		2,038	46.12%	
Labour gain from Conservative		Swing		

=== Mincinglake & Whipton ===
Mincinglake & Whipton
Party	Candidate	Votes	%	±%
Labour	Stephen Brimble	753	52.2%	
Conservative	Harry Chamberlain	369	25.6%	
Green	Isaac Price-Sosner	228	15.8%	
Liberal Democrats	Kevin Chun	92	6.4%	
Majority		384	26.6%	
Turnout		1,476	36.02%	
Labour hold		Swing		

=== Newtown ===
Newtown
Party	Candidate	Votes	%	±%
Labour	Roger Spackman	735	46.6%	
Green	Thomas Milburn	260	16.5%	
Conservative	Caroline Elsom	244	15.5%	
UKIP	Jacqueline Holdstock	185	11.7%	
Liberal Democrats	Patrick Richmond	114	7.2%	
Left Unity	David Parks	39	2.5%	
Majority		475	30.1%	
Turnout		1,587	44.19%	
Labour hold		Swing		

=== Pennsylvania ===
Pennsylvania
Party	Candidate	Votes	%	±%
Conservative	Peter Holland	772	40.2%	
Liberal Democrats	Timothy Payne	567	29.5%	
Labour	Daniel Richards	484	25.2%	
TUSC	Alfred Lethbridge	97	5.1%	
Majority		205	10.7%	
Turnout		1,949	48.87%	
Conservative gain from Liberal Democrats		Swing		

=== Pinhoe ===
Pinhoe
Party	Candidate	Votes	%	±%
Labour	Megan Williams	862	36.5%	
Conservative	Cynthia Thompson	828	35.1%	
UKIP	Keith Crawford	460	19.5%	
Green	Elizabeth Woodman	116	4.9%	
Liberal Democrats	Sally Wilcox	71	3.0%	
Independence from Europe	Helen Webster	23	1.0%	
Majority		34	1.4%	
Turnout		2,367	46.89%	
Labour hold		Swing		

=== Polsloe ===
Polsloe
Party	Candidate	Votes	%	±%
Labour	Christine Raybould	709	37.8%	
Conservative	Yolonda Henson	574	30.6%	
Green	Rouben Freeman	303	16.2%	
UKIP	Ralph Gay	150	8.0%	
Liberal Democrats	John Bosworth	109	5.8%	
TUSC	Edmund Potts	30	1.6%	
Majority		135	7.2%	
Turnout		1,887	44.82%	
Labour gain from Conservative		Swing		

=== Priory ===
Priory
Party	Candidate	Votes	%	±%
Labour	Lesley Robson	1,110	41.5%	
Conservative	Nicola Guagliardo	721	27.0%	
UKIP	Paul Kenny	504	18.8%	
Green	Alexis Taylor	189	7.1%	
Liberal Democrats	Caroline Nottle	97	3.6%	
BNP	Christopher Stone	38	1.4%	
TUSC	Jesse Dodkins	16	0.6%	
Majority		389	14.5%	
Turnout		2,693	40.23%	
Labour hold		Swing		

=== St Davids ===
St Davids
Party	Candidate	Votes	%	±%
Liberal Democrats	Stella Brock	500	30.5%	
Labour	Natalie Vizard	451	27.5%	
Green	Andrew Bell	320	19.5%	
Conservative	Elizabeth Roberts	182	11.1%	
UKIP	Colin Stewart	160	9.8%	
TUSC	Luke Pilling	26	1.6%	
Majority		49	3.0%	
Turnout		1,651	38.09%	
Liberal Democrats hold		Swing		

=== Whipton and Barton ===
Whipton and Barton
Party	Candidate	Votes	%	±%
Labour	Peter Edwards	1,029	44.8%	
UKIP	Adrian Rogers	557	24.3%	
Conservative	Christopher Carter	437	19.0%	
Green	Mark Cox	141	6.1%	
Liberal Democrats	Pamela Thickett	104	4.5%	
Independence from Europe	Mike Camp	28	1.2%	
Majority		472	20.5%	
Turnout		2,307	40.16%	
Labour hold		Swing		
