= Exeter City Council =

UK non-metropolitan district council

- Coat of arms of Exeter

- Logo

Type
- Type: Non-metropolitan district of Exeter

History
- Founded: 1 April 1974

Leadership
- Lord Mayor: Gemma Rolstone, Labour since May 2026
- Leader: Philip Bialyk, Labour since 14 May 2019
- Chief Executive: Bindu Arjoon since March 2023

Structure
- Seats: 39 councillors
- Graph of the party split among 39 seats.
- Political groups: Administration (18) Labour (18) Other parties (21) Green (10) Liberal Democrats (5) Reform (3) Conservative (1) Independent (2)

Elections
- Voting system: First past the post
- Last election: May 2026

Meeting place
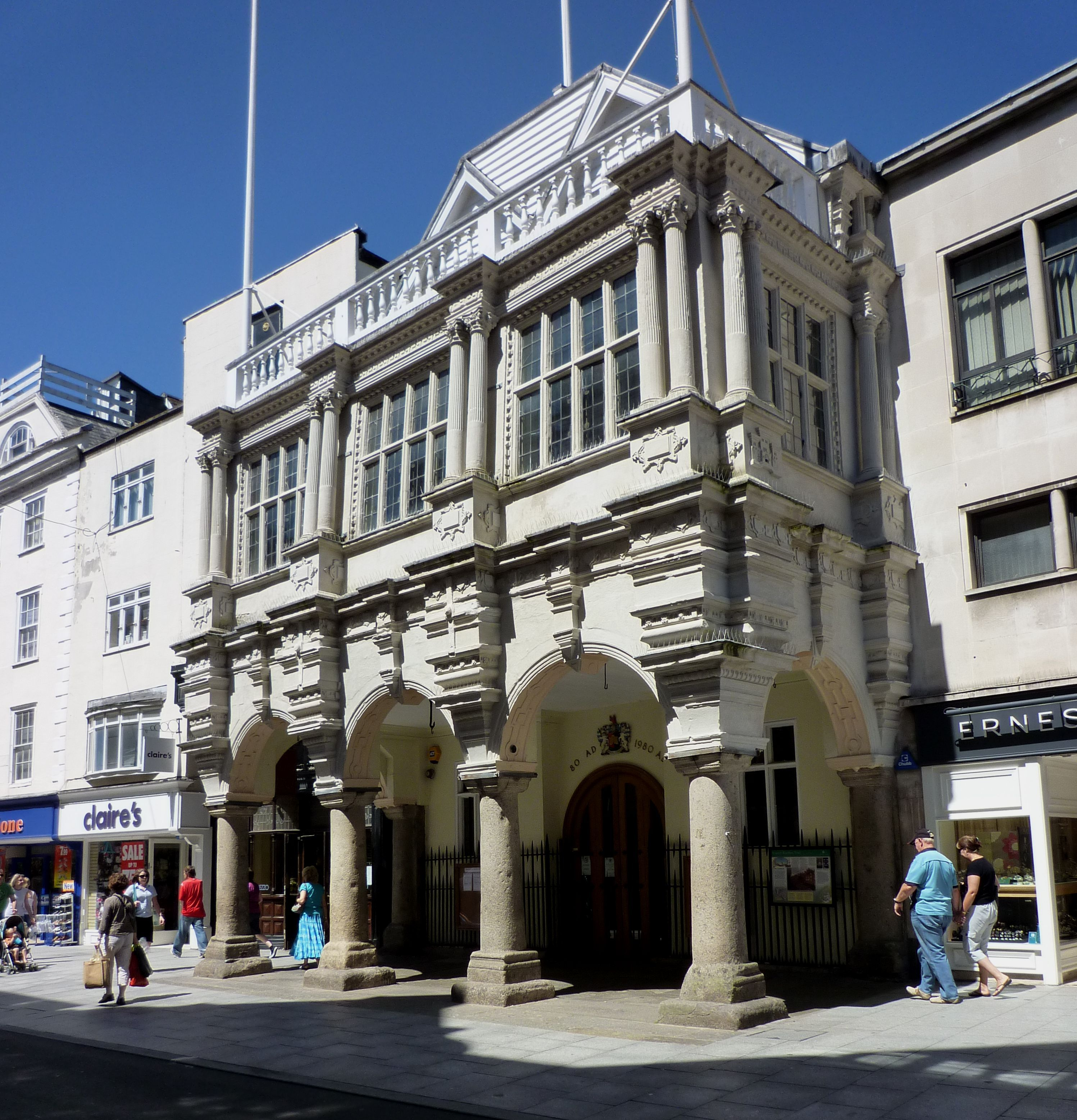
- Guildhall, 203 High Street, Exeter, EX4 3EB

Website
- exeter.gov.uk

Constitution
- The Constitution of Exeter City Council

Exeter City Council is a local authority for the city of Exeter in Devon, England. Exeter has had a city council since medieval times, which has been reformed on numerous occasions. Since 1974 it has been a non-metropolitan district council, with county-level services provided by Devon County Council.

The city council has been under no overall control since the 2026 election. The largest party on the council is Labour, and they run the council as a minority administration. The council meets at Exeter Guildhall and has its main offices at the Civic Centre on Paris Street.

== History ==
Exeter was an ancient borough with city status. It was historically governed by a corporation, also known as the city council. The city was given the right to appoint a mayor by King John in the early thirteenth century. In 1537 the city was made a county corporate with its own sheriff and quarter sessions, separating it from the jurisdiction of the Sheriff of Devon.

The city council was reformed in 1836 to become a municipal borough, governed by a body formally called the "mayor, aldermen and citizens of the city of Exeter" but informally known as the corporation or city council. When elected county councils were established in 1889 under the Local Government Act 1888 Exeter was considered large enough for its existing corporation to provide county-level services and so it was made a county borough, independent from Devon County Council.

The city was reconstituted as a non-metropolitan district on 1 April 1974 under the Local Government Act 1972, becoming a lower-tier district authority with Devon County Council providing county-level functions to the city for the first time. The city kept the same outer boundaries, but gained control of the "Devon County Buildings Area", being three separate exclaves of Devon surrounded by the city, containing Devon County Hall, Rougemont Castle and the county judges' lodgings at Larkbeare House. Exeter's city status was re-conferred on the reformed district, allowing the council to take the name Exeter City Council. The city's mayor was raised to the status of a lord mayor in 2002.

In 2010 the government proposed that the city should become an independent unitary authority, like nearby Plymouth and Torbay. The statutory orders to set up the unitary authority were passed in Parliament and a new unitary city council was due to start in Exeter on 1 April 2011. However, following the change of government at the 2010 general election the reorganisation was cancelled.

At the end of 2024, in response to the upcoming local government reorganisation to mandate the abolition of two-tier councils, the council put forward a bid to become a unitary authority. This included assuming responsibility for some of the surrounding areas. This bid was unanimously supported by the council in early 2025, but other councils in Devon (including Devon County Council) submitted competing proposals for the boundaries of the reorganisation. In July 2026, the Secretary of State for Housing, Communities and Local Government, then Steve Reed, announced that Exeter's bid for expansion had been selected. The legislation to convert Exeter into a unitary authority and enlarge its boundaries is now being prepared and due to come into effect in 2028.

== Governance ==
Exeter City Council provides district-level services. County-level services are provided by Devon County Council. There are no civil parishes in Exeter; the entire city is an unparished area.

=== Political control ===
The council went under no overall control at the 2026 election. Labour were the largest party, but fell two seats short of a majority. They subsequently formed a minority administration to run the council.

Political control of the council since the 1974 reforms took effect has been as follows:

| Party in control | Years |
|---|---|
| No overall control | 1974–1976 |
| Conservative | 1976–1983 |
| No overall control | 1983–1995 |
| Labour | 1995–2003 |
| No overall control | 2003–2012 |
| Labour | 2012–2026 |
| No overall control | 2026–present |

=== Leadership ===
The role of Lord Mayor of Exeter is largely ceremonial. Political leadership is provided by the leader of the council. The leaders since 1983 have been:

| Councillor | Party | From | To |
|---|---|---|---|
| Chester Long | Labour | 1983 | 1999 |
| Roy Slack | Labour | 1999 | May 2007 |
| Pete Edwards | Labour | 15 May 2007 | May 2008 |
| Adrian Fullam | Liberal Democrats | 13 May 2008 | Sep 2010 |
| Pete Edwards | Labour | 21 Sep 2010 | May 2019 |
| Philip Bialyk | Labour | 14 May 2019 | |

=== Composition ===
Following the 2026 elections, the composition of the council was:

| Party | Councillors |
|---|---|
| Labour | 18 |
| Green | 10 |
| Liberal Democrats | 5 |
| Reform | 3 |
| Conservative | 1 |
| Independent | 2 |
| Total | 39 |

== Premises ==
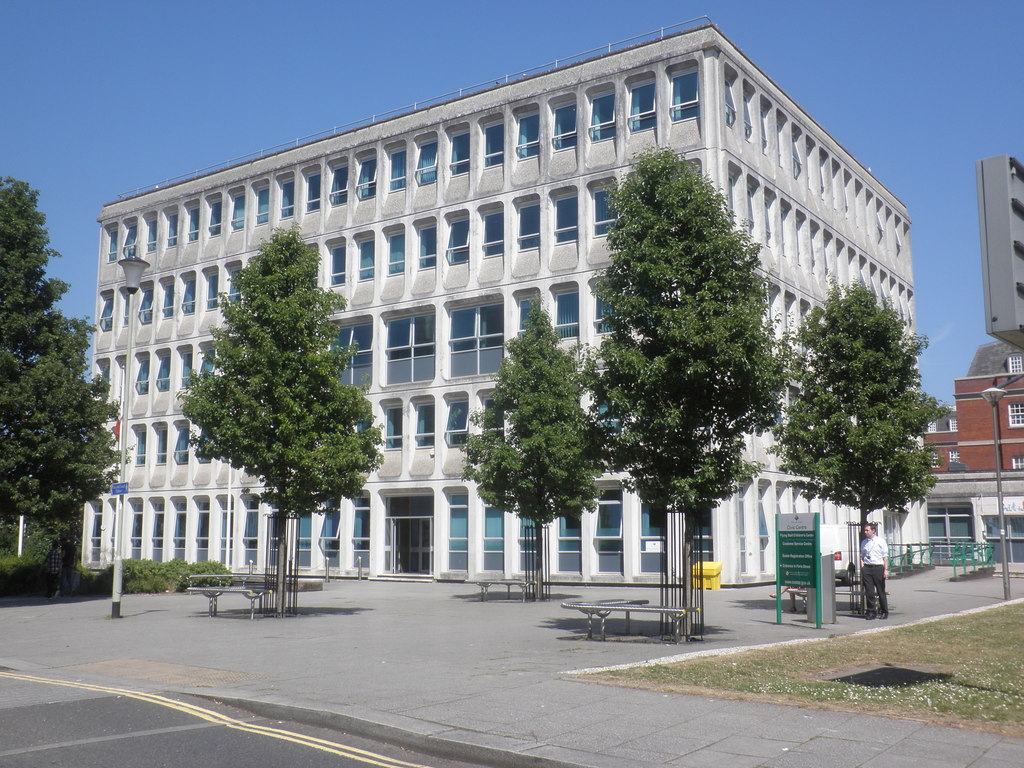
Civic Centre, Paris Street, Exeter, EX1 1JN

Full council meetings are generally held at the city's Guildhall at 203 High Street, which was built around 1470. The council's main offices are at the Civic Centre, a 1970s building on Paris Street in the city centre. The Paris Street offices are currently under-occupied, and the council plans to move into a different location, but a final decision has not yet been made.

== Elections ==
Since the last boundary changes in 2016, the council has comprised 39 councillors, representing 13 wards, with each ward electing three councillors. Elections are held three years out of every four, with a third of the council (one councillor for each ward) being elected at a time for a four-year term. Devon County Council elections are held in the fourth year of the cycle when there are no elections to the city council.

=== Wards and councillors ===
The wards of the city for City Council purposes are listed below.

- Alphington
- Duryard & St James
- Exwick
- Heavitree
- Mincinglake & Whipton
- Newtown & St Leonards
- Pennsylvania
- Pinhoe
- Priory
- St David's
- St Loyes
- St Thomas
- Topsham
