= 1987 Exeter City Council election =

1987 English local election

← 1986	7 May 1987	1988 →

12 out of 36 seats to Exeter City Council 19 seats needed for a majority

	First party	Second party
Party	Conservative	Labour
Last election	14 seats, 35.4%	15 seats, 35.3%
Seats won	5	3
Seats after	15	13
Seat change	▲1	▼2
Popular vote	10,150	7,480
Percentage	36.8%	27.1%
Swing	▲1.4%	▼8.2%
	Third party	Fourth party
Party	Alliance	Independent
Last election	6 seats, 26.0%	1 seat, 1.9%
Seats won	3	1
Seats after	7	1
Seat change	▲1	Steady
Popular vote	8,551	1,137
Percentage	31.0%	4.1%
Swing	▲5.0%	▲2.2%
Council control before election
No overall control
Council control after election
No overall control

The 1987 Exeter City Council election took place on 7 May 1987 to elect members of Exeter City Council in Devon, England. This was on the same day as other local elections.

== Summary ==
=== Election result ===
1987 Exeter City Council election
Party	This election			Full council			This election		
Party	Seats	Net	Seats %	Other	Total	Total %	Votes	Votes %	+/−
Conservative	5	▲1	41.7	10	15	41.7	10,150	36.8	+1.4
Labour	3	▼2	25.0	10	13	36.1	7,480	27.1	–8.2
Alliance	3	▲1	25.0	4	7	19.4	8,551	31.0	+5.0
Independent	1	Steady	8.3	0	1	2.8	1,137	4.1	+2.2
Green	0	Steady	0.0	0	0	0.0	238	0.9	–0.5

== Ward results ==
=== Alphington ===
Alphington
Party	Candidate	Votes	%	±%
Alliance	M. Browning*	1,754	58.0	+5.8
Conservative	R. Carr	1,009	33.3	–4.8
Labour	M. Ellis	263	8.7	+0.7
Majority		745	24.6	+10.6
Turnout		3,026	61.6	+3.3
Registered electors		4,916		
Alliance hold		Swing	▲5.3	

=== Barton ===
Barton
Party	Candidate	Votes	%	±%
Conservative	J. Gapper	992	43.2	+0.1
Labour	P. Hill	736	32.1	–13.0
Alliance	P. Davies	566	24.7	+12.9
Majority		256	11.2	N/A
Turnout		2,294	61.1	+1.0
Registered electors		3,752		
Conservative hold		Swing	▲6.7	

=== Countess Wear ===
Countess Wear
Party	Candidate	Votes	%	±%
Conservative	W. Rowe*	1,702	69.9	+5.2
Alliance	D. Smith	422	17.3	+4.0
Labour	A. Male	312	12.8	–9.2
Majority		1,280	52.5	+9.7
Turnout		2,436	65.8	+15.5
Registered electors		3,701		
Conservative hold		Swing	▲0.6	

=== Cowick ===
Cowick
Party	Candidate	Votes	%	±%
Conservative	E. Knapp*	1,009	41.5	+4.5
Labour	D. Perrin	776	31.9	–16.4
Alliance	P. Thompson	608	25.0	+9.1
Green	K. Vail	66	2.5	N/A
Majority		233	9.6	N/A
Turnout		2,459	57.7	+4.6
Registered electors		4,216		
Conservative hold		Swing	▲10.5	

=== Exwick ===
Exwick
Party	Candidate	Votes	%	±%
Alliance	P. Palmer	916	34.8	+12.1
Labour	R. Long*	904	34.4	–4.4
Conservative	E. Cooke	744	28.3	–8.0
Green	R. Vail	66	2.5	+0.3
Majority		12	0.5	N/A
Turnout		2,630	53.5	+0.8
Registered electors		4,919		
Alliance gain from Labour		Swing	▲8.3	

=== Heavitree ===
Heavitree
Party	Candidate	Votes	%	±%
Alliance	H. Bound	1,021	44.5	–5.5
Conservative	C. Broom	817	35.6	+0.8
Labour	J. Skinner	348	15.2	+0.1
Green	S. Potter	106	4.6	N/A
Majority		204	8.9	–6.3
Turnout		2,630	58.0	+5.3
Registered electors		3,950		
Alliance hold		Swing	▼3.2	

=== St Loyes ===
St Loyes
Party	Candidate	Votes	%	±%
Conservative	V. Coates*	1,000	42.5	+4.4
Alliance	A. Carless	979	41.6	+7.7
Labour	C. Duff	373	15.9	–12.1
Majority		21	0.9	–3.4
Turnout		2,352	61.5	+13.0
Registered electors		3,826		
Conservative hold		Swing	▼1.7	

=== St Thomas ===
St Thomas
Party	Candidate	Votes	%	±%
Conservative	P. Tolman	867	35.2	+5.7
Alliance	J. Lucas	833	33.8	+7.6
Labour	N. Long*	762	31.0	–13.3
Majority		34	1.4	N/A
Turnout		2,462	59.3	+3.3
Registered electors		4,152		
Conservative gain from Labour		Swing	▲1.9	

=== Stoke Hill ===
Stoke Hill
Party	Candidate	Votes	%	±%
Labour	A. Golant*	1,021	53.7	–9.6
Conservative	P. Kreling	509	26.7	+5.2
Alliance	S. Honeyball	373	19.6	+4.3
Majority		512	26.9	–14.9
Turnout		1,903	45.8	+6.0
Registered electors		4,154		
Labour hold		Swing	▼7.4	

=== Topsham ===
Topsham
Party	Candidate	Votes	%	±%
Independent	L. Parsons*	1,137	47.4	N/A
Conservative	D. Carr	772	32.2	–9.8
Alliance	M. Rossall	337	14.0	–4.6
Labour	B. Vernon	155	6.5	–4.1
Majority		365	15.2	N/A
Turnout		2,401	65.1	+7.4
Registered electors		3,690		
Independent hold				

=== Whipton ===
Whipton
Party	Candidate	Votes	%	±%
Labour	W. Hutchings*	900	53.6	–11.8
Conservative	G. Charters	455	27.1	+5.2
Alliance	A. Foot	325	19.3	+6.6
Majority		445	26.5	–17.0
Turnout		1,680	49.1	+1.8
Registered electors		3,422		
Labour hold		Swing	▼8.5	

=== Wonford ===
Wonford
Party	Candidate	Votes	%	±%
Labour	M. O'Callaghan*	930	57.4	–1.3
Alliance	N. Rowse	417	25.7	–3.6
Conservative	N. Shiel	274	16.9	+4.9
Majority		513	31.6	+2.3
Turnout		1,621	45.7	+1.9
Registered electors		3,549		
Labour hold		Swing	▲1.2	
