= 1991 Exeter City Council election =

1991 English local election

← 1990	2 May 1991	1992 →

12 out of 36 seats to Exeter City Council 19 seats needed for a majority

	First party	Second party
Party	Labour	Conservative
Last election	15 seats, 43.4%	13 seats, 26.8%
Seats won	6	3
Seats after	18	11
Seat change	▲3	▼2
Popular vote	9,764	8,796
Percentage	35.8%	32.3%
Swing	▼7.6%	▲5.5%
	Third party	Fourth party
Party	Liberal Democrats	Liberal
Last election	7 seats, 13.1%	0 seats, 3.5%
Seats won	2	1
Seats after	6	1
Seat change	▼1	▲1
Popular vote	5,127	1,086
Percentage	18.8%	4.0%
Swing	▲5.7%	▲0.5%
Council control before election
No overall control
Council control after election
No overall control

The 1991 Exeter City Council election took place on 2 May 1991 to elect members of Exeter City Council in Devon, England. This was on the same day as other local elections.

== Summary ==
=== Election result ===
1991 Exeter City Council election
Party	This election			Full council			This election		
Party	Seats	Net	Seats %	Other	Total	Total %	Votes	Votes %	+/−
Labour	6	▲3	50.0	12	18	50.0	9,764	35.8	–7.6
Conservative	3	▼2	25.0	8	11	30.6	8,796	32.3	+5.5
Liberal Democrats	2	▼1	16.7	4	6	16.7	5,127	18.8	+5.7
Liberal	1	▲1	8.3	0	1	2.8	1,086	4.0	+0.5
SDP	0	Steady	0.0	0	0	0.0	999	3.7	+1.3
Green	0	Steady	0.0	0	0	0.0	742	2.7	–5.7
Independent	0	▼1	0.0	0	0	0.0	666	2.4	+0.1
Monster Raving Loony	0	Steady	0.0	0	0	0.0	90	0.3	+0.2

== Ward results ==
=== Alphington ===
Alphington
Party	Candidate	Votes	%	±%
Liberal Democrats	M. Browning*	1,777	58.1	+3.2
Conservative	M. Jordan	747	24.4	–5.0
Labour	L. Taylor	462	15.1	+1.3
Green	D. Blackmore	70	2.3	+0.5
Majority		1,030	33.7	+9.1
Turnout		3,056	54.8	–6.8
Registered electors		5,574		
Liberal Democrats hold		Swing	▲4.1	

=== Barton ===
Barton
Party	Candidate	Votes	%	±%
Conservative	J. Gapper*	945	42.4	–1.1
Labour	H. Sterry	907	40.7	–1.7
Liberal	C. Blake	166	7.4	N/A
Liberal Democrats	P. Davies	146	6.6	+0.1
Green	M. Turnbull	65	2.9	+0.8
Majority		38	1.7	+0.7
Turnout		2,229	59.4	+6.0
Registered electors		3,731		
Conservative hold		Swing	▲0.3	

=== Countess Wear ===
Countess Wear
Party	Candidate	Votes	%	±%
Conservative	W. Rowe*	1,367	63.0	+1.3
Labour	G. Granton	517	23.8	+0.2
Liberal Democrats	J. Freeman	212	9.8	N/A
Green	E. Culpeper	58	2.7	+0.4
Monster Raving Loony	K. Langford	17	0.8	N/A
Majority		850	39.2	+1.0
Turnout		2,171	63.1	+12.1
Registered electors		3,449		
Conservative hold		Swing	▲0.6	

=== Cowick ===
Cowick
Party	Candidate	Votes	%	±%
Labour	S. Aves	1,121	45.3	–6.7
Conservative	E. Knapp*	1,016	41.0	+4.9
Liberal Democrats	Y. Pearson	316	12.8	N/A
Monster Raving Loony	A. King	24	1.0	N/A
Majority		105	4.2	–11.7
Turnout		2,477	57.5	+8.6
Registered electors		4,310		
Labour gain from Conservative		Swing	▼5.8	

=== Exwick ===
Exwick
Party	Candidate	Votes	%	±%
Labour	R. Long	1,153	39.3	–6.4
SDP	J. Palmer*	999	34.0	N/A
Conservative	J. Levers	650	22.1	–9.0
Green	K. Vail	110	3.7	–0.3
Monster Raving Loony	K. Grinstead	24	0.8	N/A
Majority		154	5.2	–9.3
Turnout		2,936	52.3	+5.1
Registered electors		5,312		
Labour gain from Liberal Democrats				

=== Heavitree ===
Heavitree
Party	Candidate	Votes	%	±%
Liberal Democrats	H. Bound*	1,005	43.1	+2.2
Conservative	N. Shiel	780	33.4	–4.2
Labour	D. Regis	437	18.7	+1.9
Green	S. Dunstan	110	4.7	±0.0
Majority		225	9.6	+6.3
Turnout		2,332	57.8	+5.3
Registered electors		4,040		
Liberal Democrats hold		Swing	▲3.2	

=== St Loyes ===
St Loyes
Party	Candidate	Votes	%	±%
Liberal	J. Morrish	920	39.2	+17.3
Conservative	B. Rendel-Jones	767	32.7	+7.8
Labour	M. Ellis	661	28.2	–13.4
Majority		153	6.5	N/A
Turnout		2,348	61.3	+6.7
Registered electors		3,839		
Liberal gain from Conservative		Swing	▲4.8	

=== St Thomas ===
St Thomas
Party	Candidate	Votes	%	±%
Labour	T. Mayo	970	42.1	–6.4
Conservative	G. Sclater	731	31.8	+9.3
Liberal Democrats	M. Horgan	501	21.8	+12.3
Green	R. Gittins	100	4.3	–2.7
Majority		239	10.4	–15.6
Turnout		2,302	55.4	–1.8
Registered electors		4,160		
Labour gain from Conservative		Swing	▼7.9	

=== Stoke Hill ===
Stoke Hill
Party	Candidate	Votes	%	±%
Labour	A. Golant*	1,188	64.5	–5.1
Conservative	H. Edginton	355	19.3	+5.5
Liberal Democrats	A. Vokes	221	12.0	+2.8
Green	M. Dorman	78	4.2	–3.2
Majority		833	45.2	–4.1
Turnout		1,842	43.7	–5.6
Registered electors		4,215		
Labour hold		Swing	▼5.3	

=== Topsham ===
Topsham
Party	Candidate	Votes	%	±%
Conservative	D. Carr	822	37.2	+0.7
Independent	M. Ware	666	30.1	N/A
Labour	J. Owen	463	20.9	+1.4
Liberal Democrats	J. Bryant	199	9.0	+1.8
Green	J. Barber	46	2.1	–3.8
Monster Raving Loony	S. Hughes	15	0.7	N/A
Majority		156	7.1	–3.3
Turnout		2,211	63.3	+0.8
Registered electors		3,496		
Conservative gain from Independent				

=== Whipton ===
Whipton
Party	Candidate	Votes	%	±%
Labour	W. Hutchings*	1,032	60.1	–6.8
Conservative	J. Coates	443	25.8	+6.6
Liberal Democrats	A. Foot	185	10.8	+4.5
Green	A. Thomas	47	2.7	–2.8
Monster Raving Loony	B. Smith	10	0.6	N/A
Majority		589	34.3	–13.4
Turnout		1,717	49.8	–4.7
Registered electors		3,449		
Labour hold		Swing	▼6.7	

=== Wonford ===
Wonford
Party	Candidate	Votes	%	±%
Labour	M. Midgley	853	51.7	–17.8
Liberal Democrats	M. Chaplin	565	34.3	+32.6
Conservative	Y. Barber	173	10.5	+4.2
Green	T. Canning	58	3.5	±0.0
Majority		288	17.5	–33.0
Turnout		1,649	47.4	–3.8
Registered electors		3,485		
Labour hold		Swing	▼25.2	
