= 1983 Exeter City Council election =

Exeter City Council election

← 1979	5 May 1983	1984 →

All 36 seats to Exeter City Council 19 seats needed for a majority

	First party	Second party
Party	Conservative	Labour
Seats won	21	10
Seat change	▼3	▲2
Popular vote	31,496	22,524
Percentage	42.6%	30.5%
Swing	▼2.1%	▼1.5%
	Third party	Fourth party
Party	Alliance	Independent
Seats won	4	1
Seat change	▲2	Steady
Popular vote	17,535	1,471
Percentage	23.7%	2.0%
Swing	▲4.9%	▼0.4%
Council control before election
Conservative
Council control after election
Conservative

The 1983 Exeter City Council election took place on 5 May 1983 to elect members of Exeter City Council in Devon, England. This was on the same day as other local elections.

== Summary ==
=== Election result ===
1983 Exeter City Council election
Party	Candidates	Seats	Gains	Losses	Net gain/loss	Seats %	Votes %	Votes	+/−
Conservative	36	21	1	4	▼3	58.3	42.6	31,496	–2.1
Labour	36	10	3	1	▲2	27.8	30.5	22,524	–1.5
Alliance	36	4	2	0	▲2	11.1	23.7	17,535	+4.9
Independent	2	1	0	0	Steady	2.8	2.0	1,471	–0.4
Ecology	6	0	0	0	Steady	0.0	1.2	902	+0.6

== Ward results ==
=== Alphington ===
Alphington (2 seats)
Party	Candidate	Votes	%	±%
Alliance	M. Browning	1,307	43.7	
Conservative	P. Spencer	1,232	41.2	
Alliance	A. Fry	1,164	38.9	
Conservative	G. Hadlett	1,051	35.1	
Labour	F. Sweeney	345	11.5	
Labour	D. Tonkin	272	9.1	
Ecology	R. Giles	105	3.5	
Turnout		2,991	62.1	
Registered electors		4,816		
Alliance gain from Conservative				
Conservative hold				

=== Barton ===
Barton (2 seats)
Party	Candidate	Votes	%	±%
Conservative	B. Taylor	811	40.1	
Conservative	K. Callis	798	39.5	
Labour	P. Edwards	791	39.2	
Labour	B. Lopez	788	39.0	
Alliance	G. Branner	420	20.8	
Alliance	S. Pembroke	403	20.0	
Turnout		2,020	53.9	
Registered electors		3,748		
Conservative hold				
Conservative hold				

=== Countess Wear ===
Countess Wear (2 seats)
Party	Candidate	Votes	%	±%
Conservative	W. Rowe	1,492	63.2	
Conservative	D. Bess	1,308	55.4	
Labour	R. Boyce	634	26.9	
Labour	M. Hesford	459	19.4	
Alliance	M. Rossall	235	10.0	
Alliance	P. Davies	216	9.2	
Turnout		2,360	62.0	
Registered electors		3,806		
Conservative hold				
Conservative hold				

=== Cowick ===
Cowick (2 seats)
Party	Candidate	Votes	%	±%
Conservative	E. Knapp	934	42.2	
Conservative	P. Mosley	908	41.0	
Labour	R. Slack	855	38.7	
Labour	C. Gale	787	35.6	
Alliance	S. Hebron	424	19.2	
Alliance	P. Thompson	397	17.9	
Turnout		2,212	51.0	
Registered electors		4,337		
Conservative hold				
Conservative hold				

=== Exwick ===
Exwick (2 seats)
Party	Candidate	Votes	%	±%
Labour	R. Long	1,019	42.2	
Conservative	H. Bower	890	36.9	
Conservative	E. Corbett-Winer	793	32.9	
Labour	P. Bialyk	787	32.6	
Alliance	P. Palmer	505	20.9	
Alliance	J. Lucas	358	14.8	
Turnout		2,414	53.9	
Registered electors		4,478		
Labour gain from Independent Labour				
Conservative gain from Labour				

=== Heavitree ===
Heavitree (2 seats)
Party	Candidate	Votes	%	±%
Alliance	J. Stanton	924	42.9	
Alliance	A. Williamson	908	42.2	
Conservative	P. Everson	882	41.0	
Conservative	T. Thomas	851	39.5	
Labour	E. Pattinson	347	16.1	
Labour	R. Smith	325	15.1	
Turnout		2,153	53.3	
Registered electors		4,040		
Alliance hold				
Alliance hold				

=== Pennsylvania ===
Pennsylvania (2 seats)
Party	Candidate	Votes	%	±%
Conservative	J. Coates	1,056	49.5	
Conservative	D. Whiteway	1,037	48.6	
Alliance	M. McNair	845	39.6	
Alliance	V. Palfrey	821	38.5	
Labour	W. Caims	230	10.8	
Labour	J. Barber	222	10.4	
Turnout		2,133	51.3	
Registered electors		4,157		
Conservative hold				
Conservative hold				

=== Pinhoe ===
Pinhoe (2 seats)
Party	Candidate	Votes	%	±%
Conservative	J. Landers	1,128	50.8	
Conservative	J. Pollitt	1,098	49.5	
Labour	I. Ford	718	32.3	
Labour	R. Westlake	698	31.4	
Alliance	C. Gale	375	16.9	
Alliance	C. Buck	344	15.5	
Turnout		2,220	54.3	
Registered electors		4,088		
Conservative hold				
Conservative hold				

=== Polsloe ===
Polsloe (2 seats)
Party	Candidate	Votes	%	±%
Conservative	P. Richardson	868	49.8	
Conservative	B. Wedgery	857	49.1	
Labour	P. Shepherd	637	36.5	
Labour	J. Marshall	629	36.1	
Alliance	P. Cockrell	279	16.0	
Alliance	T. Murray	266	15.3	
Ecology	C. Green	34	1.9	
Turnout		1,744	46.8	
Registered electors		3,726		
Conservative hold				
Conservative hold				

=== Rougemont ===
Rougemont (2 seats)
Party	Candidate	Votes	%	±%
Labour	J. Lloyd	742	34.0	
Conservative	D. Henson	679	31.1	
Labour	B. Burt	676	31.0	
Alliance	A. Carless	653	29.9	
Conservative	N. Kirk	551	25.2	
Alliance	N. Winterhalder-Byles	467	21.4	
Ecology	D. Foster	109	5.0	
Turnout		2,184	55.4	
Registered electors		3,942		
Labour gain from Conservative				
Conservative hold				

=== St Davids ===
St Davids (2 seats)
Party	Candidate	Votes	%	±%
Conservative	J. Richardson	1,316	52.4	
Conservative	R. Yeo	1,128	44.9	
Labour	P. Hughes	481	19.1	
Labour	A. Lester	471	18.8	
Alliance	G. Harboard	408	16.2	
Alliance	A. Shepherd	314	12.5	
Ecology	P. Frings	306	12.2	
Turnout		2,512	43.2	
Registered electors		5,815		
Conservative win (new seat)				
Conservative win (new seat)				

=== St Leonards ===
St Leonards (2 seats)
Party	Candidate	Votes	%	±%
Conservative	F. Davis	1,107	45.5	
Alliance	D. Nation	1,053	43.3	
Conservative	G. Owens	1,046	43.0	
Alliance	J. Medley	804	33.0	
Labour	G. Kemp	273	11.2	
Labour	R. Seaford	258	10.6	
Turnout		2,433	56.3	
Registered electors		4,322		
Conservative hold				
Alliance gain from Conservative				

=== St Loyes ===
St Loyes (2 seats)
Party	Candidate	Votes	%	±%
Conservative	V. Coates	795	46.4	
Conservative	C. Tarr	759	44.3	
Alliance	S. Smith	494	28.9	
Alliance	R. Baker	463	27.0	
Labour	S. Spence	424	24.8	
Labour	L. Whiting	418	24.4	
Turnout		1,712	48.5	
Registered electors		3,530		
Conservative hold				
Conservative hold				

=== St Thomas ===
St Thomas (2 seats)
Party	Candidate	Votes	%	±%
Labour	N. Long	1,081	44.6	
Labour	M. Rich	918	37.9	
Conservative	P. Roberts	916	37.8	
Conservative	Y. Henson	891	36.7	
Alliance	R. Red	426	17.6	
Alliance	S. Warwick	405	16.7	
Turnout		2,425	56.1	
Registered electors		4,322		
Labour hold				
Labour gain from Conservative				

=== Stoke Hill ===
Stoke Hill (2 seats)
Party	Candidate	Votes	%	±%
Labour	A. Golant	1,066	54.1	
Labour	C. Shepherd	956	48.5	
Conservative	D. Howard	613	31.1	
Conservative	M. Lowry	558	28.3	
Alliance	S. Rogers	248	12.6	
Alliance	N. Clark	224	11.4	
Independent	C. Churchward	41	2.1	
Turnout		1,970	47.8	
Registered electors		4,121		
Labour hold				
Labour hold				

=== Topsham ===
Topsham
Party	Candidate	Votes	%	±%
Independent	L. Parsons*	1,430	69.9	
Conservative	D. Stafford*	1,022	50.0	
Conservative	I. Richards	542	26.5	
Ecology	J. Smith	303	14.8	
Alliance	R. Waller	248	12.1	
Alliance	B. O'Duffy	205	10.0	
Labour	J. Clarke	142	6.9	
Labour	A. Petrie	142	6.9	
Turnout		2,046	55.8	
Registered electors		3,667		
Independent hold				
Conservative hold				

=== Whipton ===
Whipton (2 seats)
Party	Candidate	Votes	%	±%
Labour	P. Hutchings	959	57.0	
Labour	V. Long	931	55.4	
Conservative	M. Burbanks	499	29.7	
Conservative	E. Cooke	495	29.4	
Alliance	S. Douglas-Mann	180	10.7	
Alliance	D. Stone	168	10.0	
Ecology	S. Littlejohn	45	2.7	
Turnout		1,682	47.7	
Registered electors		3,526		
Labour hold				
Labour hold				

=== Wonford ===
Wonford (2 seats)
Party	Candidate	Votes	%	±%
Labour	M. O'Callaghan	1,068	63.8	
Labour	G. Clark	975	58.3	
Alliance	M. Palmer	303	18.1	
Conservative	R. Hadden	301	18.0	
Conservative	T. Meade	284	17.0	
Alliance	P. Gove	281	16.8	
Turnout		1,673	43.0	
Registered electors		3,890		
Labour hold				
Labour hold				
