= 1995 Exeter City Council election =

1995 English local election

← 1994	4 May 1995	1996 →

12 out of 36 seats to Exeter City Council 19 seats needed for a majority

	First party	Second party
Party	Labour	Conservative
Last election	16 seats, 40.9%	12 seats, 20.8%
Seats won	8	1
Seats after	18	10
Seat change	▲2	▼2
Popular vote	12,405	4,263
Percentage	53.3%	18.3%
Swing	▲12.4%	▼2.5%
	Third party	Fourth party
Party	Liberal Democrats	Liberal
Last election	6 seats, 29.6%	2 seats, 5.0%
Seats won	2	1
Seats after	6	2
Seat change	Steady	Steady
Popular vote	5,057	1,027
Percentage	21.7%	4.4%
Swing	▼7.9%	▼0.6%
Council control before election
No overall control
Council control after election
No overall control

The 1995 Exeter City Council election took place on 4 May 1995 to elect members of Exeter City Council in Devon, England. This was on the same day as other local elections.

== Summary ==
=== Election result ===
1995 Exeter City Council election
Party	This election			Full council			This election		
Party	Seats	Net	Seats %	Other	Total	Total %	Votes	Votes %	+/−
Labour	8	▲2	66.7	10	18	50.0	12,405	52.0	+11.1
Conservative	1	▼2	8.3	9	10	27.8	4,263	17.9	–2.9
Liberal Democrats	2	Steady	16.7	4	6	16.7	5,057	21.2	–8.4
Liberal	1	Steady	8.3	1	2	5.6	1,027	4.4	–0.6
Green	0	Steady	0.0	0	0	0.0	458	1.9	–0.9
National Front	0	Steady	0.0	0	0	0.0	47	0.2	–0.1

== Ward results ==
=== Alphington ===
Alphington
Party	Candidate	Votes	%	±%
Liberal Democrats	M. Browning*	1,693	61.3	+2.9
Labour	R. Mathers	682	24.7	+13.6
Conservative	M. Jordan	315	11.4	–17.5
Green	C. Slater	49	1.8	+0.3
National Front	G. Needs	21	0.8	N/A
Majority		1,011	36.6	+7.1
Turnout		2,760	47.4	+0.9
Registered electors		5,937		
Liberal Democrats hold		Swing	▼5.4	

=== Barton ===
Barton
Party	Candidate	Votes	%	±%
Labour	J. Mann	1,280	61.7	+23.0
Conservative	J. Gapper*	530	25.5	–24.3
Liberal Democrats	A. Taylor	183	8.8	+0.9
Liberal	M. Welsh	56	2.7	+0.7
Green	M. Totterdell	26	1.3	–0.3
Majority		750	36.1	N/A
Turnout		2,075	53.4	–2.0
Registered electors		3,950		
Labour gain from Conservative		Swing	▲23.7	

=== Countess Wear ===
Countess Wear
Party	Candidate	Votes	%	±%
Labour	M. Baldwin	848	41.4	+15.7
Conservative	W. Rowe*	752	36.8	–23.9
Liberal Democrats	P. Davies	356	17.4	+9.6
Liberal	M. Berry	51	2.5	–0.6
Green	T. Brenan	39	1.9	–0.8
Majority		96	4.7	N/A
Turnout		2,046	59.5	+11.6
Registered electors		3,510		
Labour gain from Conservative		Swing	▲19.8	

=== Cowick ===
Cowick
Party	Candidate	Votes	%	±%
Labour	A. Dean	1,358	66.6	+22.8
Conservative	G. Williams	429	21.0	–23.2
Liberal Democrats	K. Gilbert	253	12.4	+1.8
Majority		929	45.5	N/A
Turnout		2,040	48.4	–5.0
Registered electors		4,305		
Labour hold		Swing	▲23.0	

=== Exwick ===
Exwick
Party	Candidate	Votes	%	±%
Labour	H. Sterry	1,543	66.5	+16.4
Liberal Democrats	T. Thompson	429	18.5	+12.2
Conservative	G. Sclater	266	11.5	–19.1
Green	B. Packer	81	3.5	±0.0
Majority		1,114	48.0	+28.5
Turnout		2,319	41.2	+0.7
Registered electors		5,737		
Labour hold		Swing	▲2.1	

=== Heavitree ===
Heavitree
Party	Candidate	Votes	%	±%
Liberal Democrats	H. Bound*	801	41.7	+6.1
Labour	D. Perrin	708	36.8	+20.8
Conservative	H. Arden	348	18.1	–20.7
Green	P. Edwards	65	3.4	N/A
Majority		93	4.8	N/A
Turnout		1,922	45.6	–8.4
Registered electors		4,269		
Liberal Democrats hold		Swing	▼7.4	

=== St. Loyes ===
St. Loyes
Party	Candidate	Votes	%	±%
Liberal	J. Morrish*	920	48.7	+8.4
Labour	E. Barnett	678	35.9	+4.0
Conservative	H. Arden	221	11.7	–5.8
Liberal Democrats	A. Soper	72	3.8	–5.1
Majority		242	12.8	+4.4
Turnout		1,891	49.6	–3.7
Registered electors		3,889		
Liberal hold		Swing	▲2.2	

=== St. Thomas ===
St. Thomas
Party	Candidate	Votes	%	±%
Labour	R. Hill	1,385	67.7	+21.2
Conservative	R. Edwardson	309	15.1	–5.9
Liberal Democrats	M. Horgan	269	13.1	–13.8
Green	R. Gittins	58	2.8	–0.8
National Front	K. Needs	26	1.3	–0.7
Majority		1,076	52.6	+33.0
Turnout		2,047	48.7	+0.5
Registered electors		4,255		
Labour hold		Swing	▲13.6	

=== Stoke Hill ===
Stoke Hill
Party	Candidate	Votes	%	±%
Labour	P. Oliver	1,226	77.1	+14.1
Liberal Democrats	V. Palfrey	199	12.5	–6.7
Conservative	K. Atkins	137	8.6	–5.5
Green	M. Dorman	29	1.8	–1.8
Majority		1,027	64.6	+20.8
Turnout		1,591	38.5	–3.1
Registered electors		4,219		
Labour hold		Swing	▲10.4	

=== Topsham ===
Topsham
Party	Candidate	Votes	%	±%
Conservative	D. Carr*	749	37.1	–9.6
Liberal Democrats	M. Ballantyne	620	30.7	–4.8
Labour	K. Owen	598	29.6	+14.4
Green	R. Michaelson	53	2.6	±0.0
Majority		129	6.4	–4.9
Turnout		2,020	59.3	–4.2
Registered electors		3,460		
Conservative hold		Swing	▼2.4	

=== Whipton ===
Whipton
Party	Candidate	Votes	%	±%
Labour	P. Edwards	1,236	76.2	+6.6
Conservative	M. Fretwell	207	12.8	+9.4
Liberal Democrats	A. Vokes	147	9.1	–17.9
Green	S. Dunstan	31	1.9	N/A
Majority		1,029	63.5	+21.0
Turnout		1,621	42.8	–2.3
Registered electors		3,862		
Labour hold		Swing	▲1.4	

=== Wonford ===
Wonford
Party	Candidate	Votes	%	±%
Labour	M. Midgley*	863	56.1	–1.2
Liberal	D. Morrish	613	39.9	+12.4
Liberal Democrats	A. Fullam	35	2.3	–7.6
Green	A. Thomas	27	1.8	N/A
Majority		250	16.3	–13.5
Turnout		1,621	45.4	–1.1
Registered electors		3,468		
Labour hold		Swing	▼5.6	
