= 1990 Exeter City Council election =

1990 English local election

← 1988	3 May 1990	1991 →

12 out of 36 seats to Exeter City Council 19 seats needed for a majority

	First party	Second party
Party	Labour	Conservative
Last election	13 seats, 30.4%	15 seats, 38.6%
Seats won	8	3
Seats after	15	13
Seat change	▲2	▼2
Popular vote	11,918	7,350
Percentage	43.4%	26.8%
Swing	▲13.0 points	▼11.8 points
	Third party	Fourth party
Party	SLD	Independent
Last election	7 seats, 19.5%	1 seat, 2.9%
Seats won	1	0
Seats after	7	1
Seat change	Steady	Steady
Popular vote	3,606	634
Percentage	13.1%	2.3%
Swing	▼6.4 points	▼0.6 points
Council control before election
No overall control
Council control after election
No overall control

The 1990 Exeter City Council election took place on 3 May 1990 to elect members of Exeter City Council in Devon, England. This was on the same day as other local elections.

== Summary ==
=== Election result ===
1990 Exeter City Council election
Party	This election			Full council			This election		
Party	Seats	Net	Seats %	Other	Total	Total %	Votes	Votes %	+/−
Labour	8	▲2	66.7	7	15	41.7	11,918	43.4	+13.0
Conservative	3	▼2	25.0	10	13	36.1	7,350	26.8	–11.8
SLD	1	Steady	8.3	6	7	19.4	3,606	13.1	–6.4
Independent	0	Steady	0.0	1	1	2.8	634	2.3	–0.6
Green	0	Steady	0.0	0	0	0.0	2,311	8.4	+4.4
Liberal	0	Steady	0.0	0	0	0.0	967	3.5	N/A
SDP	0	Steady	0.0	0	0	0.0	656	2.4	–2.2
Monster Raving Loony	0	Steady	0.0	0	0	0.0	19	0.1	N/A

== Ward results ==
=== Pennsylvania ===
Pennsylvania
Party	Candidate	Votes	%	±%
SLD	J. Holman*	1,042	39.5	–9.4
Conservative	K. Mullins	841	31.9	–6.0
Labour	L. Taylor	449	17.0	+7.1
Green	A. Giles	236	8.9	+5.5
SDP	S. Hebron	70	2.7	N/A
Majority		201	7.6	–3.4
Turnout		2,638	55.4	
Registered electors		4,758		
SLD hold		Swing	▼1.7	

=== Pinhoe ===
Pinhoe
Party	Candidate	Votes	%	±%
Labour	M. Mitchell	1,198	48.3	+14.7
Conservative	J. Landers*	946	38.1	+10.3
Liberal	J. Gale	152	6.1	N/A
SLD	J. Dawick	98	4.0	N/A
Green	M. Turnbull	86	3.5	+1.6
Majority		252	10.2	+9.6
Turnout		2,480	62.4	+4.0
Registered electors		3,974		
Labour gain from Conservative		Swing	▲2.2	

=== Polsloe ===
Polsloe
Party	Candidate	Votes	%	±%
Labour	P. Shepherd*	1,006	49.5	+10.4
Conservative	E. Runciman	535	26.3	–23.4
Green	P. Macnaughten	271	13.3	+9.5
SLD	D. Yeld	157	7.7	N/A
SDP	P. Carpenter	63	3.1	–4.4
Majority		471	23.2	N/A
Turnout		2,032	56.0	+3.8
Registered electors		3,631		
Labour hold		Swing	▲16.9	

=== Rougemont ===
Rougemont
Party	Candidate	Votes	%	±%
Labour	J. Lloyd*	1,199	57.1	+2.7
Conservative	P. Rees	414	19.7	–11.0
Green	R. Vail	222	10.6	+4.3
SLD	P. Davies	215	10.2	+1.6
Independent	C. Churchward	49	2.3	N/A
Majority		785	37.4	+13.6
Turnout		2,099	51.3	+2.4
Registered electors		4,090		
Labour hold		Swing	▲6.9	

=== St Davids ===
St Davids
Party	Candidate	Votes	%	±%
Conservative	J. Richardson*	1,097	35.4	–3.6
Labour	K. Baker	868	28.0	+5.7
Green	S. Potter	594	19.2	+9.4
SLD	D. Treharne	450	14.5	–14.4
SDP	J. Clark	92	3.0	N/A
Majority		229	7.4	–2.7
Turnout		2,099	54.3	+11.1
Registered electors		5,713		
Conservative hold		Swing	▼4.7	

=== St Leonards ===
St Leonards
Party	Candidate	Votes	%	±%
Conservative	J. Rogers*	858	33.8	–13.7
SLD	V. Howell	773	30.4	+7.8
Labour	M. Midgley	737	29.0	+3.7
Green	T. Brenan	174	6.8	+2.2
Majority		85	3.3	–17.5
Turnout		3,101	58.7	+9.6
Registered electors		4,329		
Conservative hold		Swing	▼10.8	

=== St Loyes ===
St Loyes
Party	Candidate	Votes	%	±%
Labour	E. Barnett	895	41.6	+25.7
Conservative	A. Hardie	536	24.9	–17.6
Liberal	J. Morrish	471	21.9	N/A
SLD	J. Freeman	141	6.6	–35.0
Green	R. Gittins	106	4.9	N/A
Majority		359	16.7	N/A
Turnout		2,149	54.6	–6.9
Registered electors		4,241		
Labour gain from Conservative		Swing	▲21.7	

=== St Thomas ===
St Thomas
Party	Candidate	Votes	%	±%
Labour	M. Rich*	1,177	48.5	+17.5
Conservative	G. Sclater	546	22.5	–12.7
SDP	M. Horgan	285	11.7	N/A
SLD	Y. Pearson	230	9.5	–24.3
Green	D. Blackmore	170	7.0	N/A
Monster Raving Loony	S. Hughes	19	0.8	N/A
Majority		631	26.0	N/A
Turnout		2,427	57.2	–2.1
Registered electors		4,241		
Labour hold		Swing	▲15.1	

=== Stoke Hill ===
Stoke Hill
Party	Candidate	Votes	%	±%
Labour	P. Hill	1,440	69.6	+15.9
Conservative	T. Mulhall	285	13.8	–12.9
SLD	A. Vokes	190	9.2	–10.4
Green	K. Vail	154	7.4	N/A
Majority		1,155	55.8	+28.9
Turnout		2,069	49.3	+3.5
Registered electors		4,201		
Labour hold		Swing	▲14.4	

=== Topsham ===
Topsham
Party	Candidate	Votes	%	±%
Conservative	I. Richards*	819	36.5	+4.3
Independent	B. Bowker	585	26.1	N/A
Labour	J. Owen	438	19.5	+13.0
SLD	J. Bryant	161	7.2	–6.8
Green	J. Smith	133	5.9	N/A
SDP	P. Gove	106	4.7	N/A
Majority		234	10.4	N/A
Turnout		2,242	62.5	–2.6
Registered electors		3,586		
Conservative hold				

=== Whipton ===
Whipton
Party	Candidate	Votes	%	±%
Labour	V. Long*	1,252	66.9	+13.3
Conservative	C. Broughton	359	19.2	–7.9
SLD	A. Foot	118	6.3	–13.0
Green	E. Culpeper	102	5.5	N/A
SDP	P. Thompson	40	2.1	N/A
Majority		893	47.7	+21.2
Turnout		1,871	54.5	+5.4
Registered electors		3,432		
Labour hold		Swing	▲10.6	

=== Wonford ===
Wonford
Party	Candidate	Votes	%	±%
Labour	G. Clark*	1,259	69.5	+12.1
Liberal	J. Langdon	344	19.0	N/A
Conservative	E. Martin	114	6.3	–10.6
Green	T. Canning	63	3.5	N/A
SLD	T. Revesz	31	1.7	–15.2
Majority		915	50.5	+18.9
Turnout		1,811	51.2	+5.5
Registered electors		3,534		
Labour hold				
