= 1986 Exeter City Council election =

1986 English local election

← 1984	8 May 1986	1987 →

12 out of 36 seats to Exeter City Council 19 seats needed for a majority

	First party	Second party
Party	Labour	Conservative
Last election	14 seats, 27.0%	16 seats, 43.2%
Seats won	6	5
Seats after	15	14
Seat change	▲1	▼2
Popular vote	8,673	8,715
Percentage	35.3%	35.4%
Swing	▲8.3 pp	▼7.8 pp
	Third party	Fourth party
Party	Alliance	Independent
Last election	5 seats, 28.7%	0 seats, 0.0%
Seats won	1	0
Seats after	6	1
Seat change	▲1	Steady
Popular vote	6,391	475
Percentage	26.0%	1.9%
Swing	▼2.7 pp	N/A
Council control before election
No overall control
Council control after election
No overall control

The 1986 Exeter City Council election took place on 8 May 1986 to elect members of Exeter City Council in Devon, England. This was on the same day as other local elections.

== Summary ==
=== Election result ===
1986 Exeter City Council election
Party	This election			Full council			This election		
Party	Seats	Net	Seats %	Other	Total	Total %	Votes	Votes %	+/−
Labour	6	▲1	50.0	9	15	41.7	8,673	35.3	+8.3
Conservative	5	▼2	41.7	9	14	38.9	8,715	35.4	–7.8
Alliance	1	▲1	8.3	5	6	16.7	6,391	26.0	–2.7
Independent	0	Steady	0.0	1	1	2.8	475	1.9	N/A
Green	0	Steady	0.0	0	0	0.0	338	1.4	+0.3

== Ward results ==
=== Pennsylvania ===
Pennsylvania
Party	Candidate	Votes	%	±%
Alliance	J. Holman	1,127	47.5	–2.2
Conservative	J. Coates*	938	39.5	–1.3
Labour	M. Taylor	310	13.1	+3.4
Majority		189	8.0	N/A
Turnout		2,376	50.7	–1.0
Registered electors		4,687		
Alliance gain from Conservative		Swing	▼0.5	

=== Pinhoe ===
Pinhoe
Party	Candidate	Votes	%	±%
Conservative	J. Landers*	1,111	48.9	–6.3
Labour	R. Northcott	879	38.7	+6.7
Alliance	J. Pearson	283	12.5	–0.4
Majority		232	10.2	N/A
Turnout		2,274	56.4	+9.3
Registered electors		4,036		
Conservative hold		Swing	▼6.5	

=== Polsloe ===
Polsloe
Party	Candidate	Votes	%	±%
Labour	P. Shepherd	771	44.4	+6.8
Conservative	P. Richardson*	673	38.8	–9.2
Alliance	G. Branner	292	16.8	+2.3
Majority		98	5.6	N/A
Turnout		1,736	46.5	+1.4
Registered electors		3,739		
Labour gain from Conservative		Swing	▲8.0	

=== Rougemont ===
Rougemont
Party	Candidate	Votes	%	±%
Labour	J. Lloyd*	954	47.6	+11.3
Conservative	D. Moore-Tabb	573	28.6	–4.5
Alliance	P. Davies	376	18.8	–9.8
Green	A. Giles	100	5.0	+2.9
Majority		381	19.0	+15.8
Turnout		2,003	51.5	–1.5
Registered electors		3,900		
Labour hold		Swing	▲7.9	

=== St Davids ===
St Davids
Party	Candidate	Votes	%	±%
Conservative	J. Richardson*	1,186	43.4	–9.4
Alliance	J. May	981	35.9	+18.1
Labour	A. Lester	563	20.6	–4.6
Majority		205	7.5	–18.0
Turnout		2,730	47.5	+18.0
Registered electors		5,766		
Conservative hold		Swing	▼13.8	

=== St Leonards ===
St Leonards
Party	Candidate	Votes	%	±%
Conservative	A. Rogers	1,048	46.2	+0.9
Alliance	R. Ballard	766	33.8	–6.5
Labour	R. Snowden	353	15.6	+4.2
Green	T. Canning	100	4.4	+1.4
Majority		282	12.4	+7.4
Turnout		2,267	53.5	+1.3
Registered electors		4,297		
Conservative hold		Swing	▲3.7	

=== St Loyes ===
St Loyes
Party	Candidate	Votes	%	±%
Conservative	A. Parr	687	38.1	–8.3
Alliance	A. Carless	610	33.9	+5.0
Labour	C. Duff	505	28.0	+3.2
Majority		77	4.3	N/A
Turnout		1,802	48.5	±0.0
Registered electors		3,719		
Conservative hold		Swing	▼6.7	

=== St Thomas ===
St Thomas
Party	Candidate	Votes	%	±%
Labour	M. Rich	1,055	44.3	–0.3
Conservative	H. Bower	704	29.5	–8.3
Alliance	J. Lucas	625	26.2	+8.6
Majority		351	14.7	N/A
Turnout		2,384	56.0	–0.1
Registered electors		4,266		
Labour hold		Swing	▲4.0	

=== Stoke Hill ===
Stoke Hill
Party	Candidate	Votes	%	±%
Labour	C. Shepherd	1,040	63.3	+9.1
Conservative	K. Gater	353	21.5	–9.6
Alliance	S. Honeyball	251	15.3	+2.7
Majority		687	41.8	N/A
Turnout		1,644	39.8	–8.0
Registered electors		4,143		
Labour hold		Swing	▲9.4	

=== Topsham ===
Topsham
Party	Candidate	Votes	%	±%
Conservative	I. Richards	892	42.0	+9.5
Independent	B. Bowker	475	22.4	N/A
Alliance	M. Rossall	394	18.6	+10.7
Labour	B. Vernon	224	10.6	+6.1
Green	J. Smith	138	6.5	–3.1
Majority		417	19.6	N/A
Turnout		2,123	57.7	+1.9
Registered electors		3,704		
Conservative hold				

=== Whipton ===
Whipton
Party	Candidate	Votes	%	±%
Labour	V. Long*	1,057	65.4	+8.4
Conservative	B. Harwood	354	21.9	–7.7
Alliance	A. Foot	205	12.7	+2.0
Majority		703	43.5	N/A
Turnout		1,616	47.3	–4.2
Registered electors		3,422		
Labour hold		Swing	▲8.1	

=== Wonford ===
Wonford
Party	Candidate	Votes	%	±%
Labour	G. Clark*	962	58.7	–5.2
Alliance	N. Rowse	481	29.3	+11.2
Conservative	C. Broom	196	12.0	–6.0
Majority		481	29.3	N/A
Turnout		1,639	43.8	+0.8
Registered electors		3,756		
Labour hold		Swing	▼8.2	
