= 1988 Exeter City Council election =

1988 English local election

| ← 1987 | 5 May 1988 | 1990 → |

12 out of 36 seats to Exeter City Council 19 seats needed for a majority

| | First party | Second party |
|---|---|---|
| Party | Conservative | Labour |
| Last election | 15 seats, 36.8% | 13 seats, 27.1% |
| Seats won | 5 | 4 |
| Seats after | 15 | 13 |
| Seat change | Steady | Steady |
| Popular vote | 10,277 | 8,092 |
| Percentage | 38.6% | 30.4% |
| Swing | ▲1.8% | ▲3.3% |
| | Third party | Fourth party |
| Party | SLD | Independent |
| Last election | 7 seats, 31.0% | 1 seat, 4.1% |
| Seats won | 3 | 0 |
| Seats after | 7 | 1 |
| Seat change | Steady | Steady |
| Popular vote | 5,186 | 770 |
| Percentage | 19.5% | 2.9% |
| Swing | ▼11.5% | ▼1.2% |
Council control before election
No overall control
Council control after election
No overall control

The 1988 Exeter City Council election took place on 5 May 1988 to elect members of Exeter City Council in Devon, England. This was on the same day as other local elections.

== Summary ==
=== Election result ===
1988 Exeter City Council election
| Party | This election | | | Full council | | | This election | | |
| Party | Seats | Net | Seats % | Other | Total | Total % | Votes | Votes % | +/− |
|---|---|---|---|---|---|---|---|---|---|
| Conservative | 5 | Steady | 41.7 | 10 | 15 | 41.7 | 10,277 | 38.6 | +1.8 |
| Labour | 4 | Steady | 33.3 | 9 | 13 | 36.1 | 8,092 | 30.4 | +3.3 |
| SLD | 3 | Steady | 25.0 | 4 | 7 | 19.4 | 5,186 | 19.5 | –11.5 |
| Independent | 0 | Steady | 0.0 | 1 | 1 | 2.8 | 770 | 2.9 | –1.2 |
| SDP | 0 | Steady | 0.0 | 0 | 0 | 0.0 | 1,230 | 4.6 | N/A |
| Green | 0 | Steady | 0.0 | 0 | 0 | 0.0 | 1,054 | 4.0 | +3.1 |

== Ward results ==
=== Alphington ===
Alphington
| Party | Candidate | Votes | % | ±% |
|---|---|---|---|---|
| SLD | A. Fry* | 1,471 | 54.9 | –3.1 |
| Conservative | S. Dyer | 787 | 29.4 | –3.9 |
| Labour | N. Long | 370 | 13.8 | +5.1 |
| Green | P. M. MacNaughten | 49 | 1.8 | N/A |
| Majority | | 684 | 25.6 | +1.0 |
| Turnout | | 2,677 | 53.2 | –8.4 |
| Registered electors | | 5,032 | | |
| SLD hold | | Swing | ▲0.4 | |

=== Barton ===
Barton
| Party | Candidate | Votes | % | ±% |
|---|---|---|---|---|
| Conservative | B. McNamara | 878 | 43.5 | +0.3 |
| Labour | H. Sterry | 857 | 42.4 | +10.3 |
| SLD | P. Davies | 131 | 6.5 | –18.2 |
| SDP | R. Bassett | 112 | 5.5 | N/A |
| Green | T. Brenan | 42 | 2.1 | N/A |
| Majority | | 21 | 1.0 | –10.1 |
| Turnout | | 2,020 | 53.4 | –7.7 |
| Registered electors | | 3,783 | | |
| Conservative gain from Labour | | Swing | ▼5.0 | |

=== Countess Wear ===
Countess Wear
| Party | Candidate | Votes | % | ±% |
|---|---|---|---|---|
| Conservative | D. Bess* | 1,144 | 61.7 | –8.2 |
| Labour | L. Duddington | 437 | 23.6 | +10.8 |
| SDP | D. Smith | 229 | 12.4 | N/A |
| Green | M. Stoolman | 43 | 2.3 | N/A |
| Majority | | 707 | 38.2 | –14.3 |
| Turnout | | 1,853 | 51.0 | –14.8 |
| Registered electors | | 3,633 | | |
| Conservative hold | | Swing | ▼9.5 | |

=== Cowick ===
Cowick
| Party | Candidate | Votes | % | ±% |
|---|---|---|---|---|
| Labour | R. Slack* | 1,123 | 52.0 | +20.1 |
| Conservative | J. Tarrant | 779 | 36.1 | –5.4 |
| SDP | P. Thompson | 205 | 9.5 | N/A |
| Green | K. Vail | 53 | 2.5 | ±0.0 |
| Majority | | 344 | 15.9 | N/A |
| Turnout | | 2,160 | 48.9 | –8.8 |
| Registered electors | | 4,417 | | |
| Labour hold | | Swing | ▲12.8 | |

=== Exwick ===
Exwick
| Party | Candidate | Votes | % | ±% |
|---|---|---|---|---|
| Labour | A. Male | 1,087 | 45.7 | +11.3 |
| Conservative | E. Chambers | 741 | 31.1 | +2.8 |
| SDP | S. Hebron | 456 | 19.2 | N/A |
| Green | A. Campbell | 95 | 4.0 | +1.5 |
| Majority | | 346 | 14.5 | N/A |
| Turnout | | 2,379 | 47.2 | –5.5 |
| Registered electors | | 5,040 | | |
| Labour hold | | Swing | ▲4.3 | |

=== Heavitree ===
Heavitree
| Party | Candidate | Votes | % | ±% |
|---|---|---|---|---|
| SLD | A. Williamson* | 847 | 40.9 | –3.6 |
| Conservative | N. Shiel | 779 | 37.6 | +2.0 |
| Labour | M. Ellis | 349 | 16.8 | +1.6 |
| Green | S. Potter | 98 | 4.7 | +0.1 |
| Majority | | 68 | 3.3 | –6.6 |
| Turnout | | 2,073 | 52.5 | –5.5 |
| Registered electors | | 3,949 | | |
| SLD hold | | Swing | ▼2.8 | |

=== Pennsylvania ===
Pennsylvania
| Party | Candidate | Votes | % | ±% |
|---|---|---|---|---|
| SLD | M. Macnair* | 1,268 | 48.9 | +1.4 |
| Conservative | K. Mullins | 982 | 37.9 | –1.6 |
| Labour | J. Nelson | 256 | 9.9 | –3.2 |
| Green | S. Dunstan | 87 | 3.4 | N/A |
| Majority | | 286 | 11.0 | +3.0 |
| Turnout | | 2,593 | 53.8 | +3.1 |
| Registered electors | | 4,820 | | |
| SLD hold | | Swing | ▲1.5 | |

=== Pinhoe ===
Pinhoe
| Party | Candidate | Votes | % | ±% |
|---|---|---|---|---|
| Labour | R. Northcott | 784 | 33.6 | –5.1 |
| Independent | J. Politt* | 770 | 33.0 | N/A |
| Conservative | B. Harwood | 650 | 27.8 | –21.1 |
| SDP | P. Gove | 87 | 3.7 | N/A |
| Green | J. Rosser | 45 | 1.9 | N/A |
| Majority | | 14 | 0.6 | N/A |
| Turnout | | 2,336 | 58.4 | +2.0 |
| Registered electors | | 4,000 | | |
| Labour gain from Conservative | | | | |

=== Polsloe ===
Polsloe
| Party | Candidate | Votes | % | ±% |
|---|---|---|---|---|
| Conservative | Y. Henson* | 936 | 49.7 | +10.9 |
| Labour | M. Midgley | 737 | 39.1 | –5.3 |
| SDP | P. Carpenter | 141 | 7.5 | N/A |
| Green | J. Cooper | 71 | 3.8 | N/A |
| Majority | | 199 | 10.6 | +0.4 |
| Turnout | | 1,885 | 52.2 | +5.7 |
| Registered electors | | 3,611 | | |
| Conservative hold | | Swing | ▲8.1 | |

=== Rougemont ===
Rougemont
| Party | Candidate | Votes | % | ±% |
|---|---|---|---|---|
| Labour | B. Burt* | 1,079 | 54.4 | +6.8 |
| Conservative | J. Perham | 608 | 30.7 | +2.1 |
| SLD | T. Thompson | 171 | 8.6 | –10.2 |
| Green | R. Vail | 125 | 6.3 | +1.3 |
| Majority | | 471 | 23.8 | +4.8 |
| Turnout | | 1,983 | 48.9 | –2.6 |
| Registered electors | | 4,055 | | |
| Labour hold | | Swing | ▲2.4 | |

=== St Davids ===
St Davids
| Party | Candidate | Votes | % | ±% |
|---|---|---|---|---|
| Conservative | R. Yeo* | 992 | 39.0 | –4.4 |
| SLD | R. Hunt | 736 | 28.9 | –7.0 |
| Labour | P. Butler | 566 | 22.3 | +1.7 |
| Green | M. Turnbull | 249 | 9.8 | N/A |
| Majority | | 256 | 10.1 | +2.6 |
| Turnout | | 2,543 | 43.2 | –4.3 |
| Registered electors | | 5,887 | | |
| Conservative hold | | Swing | ▲1.3 | |

=== St Leonards ===
St Leonards
| Party | Candidate | Votes | % | ±% |
|---|---|---|---|---|
| Conservative | G. Owens* | 1,001 | 47.5 | +1.3 |
| SLD | V. Howell | 562 | 26.7 | –7.1 |
| Labour | P. Hill | 447 | 21.2 | +5.6 |
| Green | T. Canning | 97 | 4.6 | +0.2 |
| Majority | | 439 | 20.8 | +8.4 |
| Turnout | | 2,107 | 49.1 | –4.4 |
| Registered electors | | 4,291 | | |
| Conservative hold | | Swing | ▲4.2 | |
