= 1992 Exeter City Council election =

1992 English local election

| ← 1991 | 7 May 1992 | 1994 → |

12 out of 36 seats to Exeter City Council 19 seats needed for a majority

| | First party | Second party |
|---|---|---|
| Party | Labour | Conservative |
| Last election | 18 seats, 35.8% | 11 seats, 32.3% |
| Seats won | 2 | 8 |
| Seats after | 16 | 14 |
| Seat change | ▼2 | ▲3 |
| Popular vote | 8,261 | 10,481 |
| Percentage | 31.9% | 40.4% |
| Swing | ▼3.9% | ▲8.1% |
| | Third party | Fourth party |
| Party | Liberal Democrats | Liberal |
| Last election | 6 seats, 18.8% | 1 seat, 4.0% |
| Seats won | 2 | 0 |
| Seats after | 5 | 1 |
| Seat change | ▼1 | Steady |
| Popular vote | 5,739 | 338 |
| Percentage | 22.1% | 1.3% |
| Swing | ▲3.3% | ▼2.7% |
Council control before election
No overall control
Council control after election
No overall control

The 1992 Exeter City Council election took place on 7 May 1992 to elect members of Exeter City Council in Devon, England. This was on the same day as other local elections.

== Summary ==
=== Election result ===
1992 Exeter City Council election
| Party | This election | | | Full council | | | This election | | |
| Party | Seats | Net | Seats % | Other | Total | Total % | Votes | Votes % | +/− |
|---|---|---|---|---|---|---|---|---|---|
| Labour | 2 | ▼2 | 16.7 | 14 | 16 | 44.4 | 8,261 | 31.9 | –3.9 |
| Conservative | 8 | ▲3 | 66.7 | 6 | 14 | 38.9 | 10,481 | 40.4 | +8.1 |
| Liberal Democrats | 2 | ▼1 | 16.7 | 3 | 5 | 13.9 | 5,739 | 22.1 | +3.3 |
| Liberal | 0 | Steady | 0.0 | 1 | 1 | 2.8 | 338 | 1.3 | –2.7 |
| Green | 0 | Steady | 0.0 | 0 | 0 | 0.0 | 806 | 3.1 | +0.4 |
| Independent | 0 | Steady | 0.0 | 0 | 0 | 0.0 | 311 | 1.2 | –1.2 |

== Ward results ==
=== Alphington ===
Alphington
| Party | Candidate | Votes | % | ±% |
|---|---|---|---|---|
| Liberal Democrats | P. Hicks | 1,550 | 58.4 | +0.3 |
| Conservative | M. Jordan | 767 | 28.9 | +4.5 |
| Labour | L. Taylor | 294 | 11.1 | –4.0 |
| Green | R. Gittins | 41 | 1.5 | –0.8 |
| Majority | | 783 | 29.5 | –4.2 |
| Turnout | | 2,652 | 46.5 | –8.3 |
| Registered electors | | 5,775 | | |
| Liberal Democrats hold | | Swing | ▼2.1 | |

=== Barton ===
Barton
| Party | Candidate | Votes | % | ±% |
|---|---|---|---|---|
| Conservative | B. McNamara* | 1,045 | 49.8 | +7.4 |
| Labour | H. Sterry | 812 | 38.7 | –2.0 |
| Liberal Democrats | T. Thompson | 166 | 7.9 | +1.3 |
| Liberal | B. Wheeler | 41 | 2.0 | –5.4 |
| Green | J. Barber | 33 | 1.6 | –1.3 |
| Majority | | 233 | 11.1 | +9.4 |
| Turnout | | 2,097 | 55.4 | –4.0 |
| Registered electors | | 3,844 | | |
| Conservative hold | | Swing | ▲4.7 | |

=== Countess Wear ===
Countess Wear
| Party | Candidate | Votes | % | ±% |
|---|---|---|---|---|
| Conservative | D. Bess* | 1,027 | 60.7 | –2.3 |
| Labour | M. Baldwin | 435 | 25.7 | +1.9 |
| Liberal Democrats | J. Freeman | 132 | 7.8 | –2.0 |
| Liberal | B. Pentecost | 52 | 3.1 | N/A |
| Green | R. Vail | 45 | 2.7 | ±0.0 |
| Majority | | 592 | 35.0 | –4.2 |
| Turnout | | 1,691 | 47.9 | –15.2 |
| Registered electors | | 3,592 | | |
| Conservative hold | | Swing | ▼2.1 | |

=== Cowick ===
Cowick
| Party | Candidate | Votes | % | ±% |
|---|---|---|---|---|
| Conservative | E. Knapp | 1,017 | 44.2 | +3.2 |
| Labour | R. Slack* | 1,008 | 43.8 | –1.5 |
| Liberal Democrats | M. Horgan | 244 | 10.6 | –2.2 |
| Green | A. Foster | 31 | 1.3 | N/A |
| Majority | | 9 | 0.4 | N/A |
| Turnout | | 2,300 | 53.4 | –4.1 |
| Registered electors | | 4,355 | | |
| Conservative gain from Labour | | Swing | ▲2.4 | |

=== Exwick ===
Exwick
| Party | Candidate | Votes | % | ±% |
|---|---|---|---|---|
| Labour | A. Male* | 1,099 | 50.1 | +10.8 |
| Conservative | E. Chambers | 670 | 30.6 | +8.5 |
| Independent | M. Retter | 208 | 9.5 | N/A |
| Liberal Democrats | J. Bahrij | 139 | 6.3 | N/A |
| Green | K. Vail | 76 | 3.5 | –0.2 |
| Majority | | 429 | 19.5 | +14.3 |
| Turnout | | 2,192 | 40.5 | –11.8 |
| Registered electors | | 5,496 | | |
| Labour hold | | Swing | ▲1.2 | |

=== Heavitree ===
Heavitree
| Party | Candidate | Votes | % | ±% |
|---|---|---|---|---|
| Conservative | N. Shiel | 862 | 38.8 | +5.4 |
| Liberal Democrats | A. Williamson* | 791 | 35.6 | –7.5 |
| Labour | T. Badcock | 356 | 16.0 | –2.7 |
| Liberal | M. Chaplin | 215 | 9.7 | N/A |
| Majority | | 71 | 3.2 | N/A |
| Turnout | | 2,224 | 54.0 | –3.8 |
| Registered electors | | 4,172 | | |
| Conservative gain from Liberal Democrats | | Swing | ▲6.5 | |

=== Pennsylvania ===
Pennsylvania
| Party | Candidate | Votes | % | ±% |
|---|---|---|---|---|
| Conservative | S. Syvret | 913 | 43.0 | +11.1 |
| Liberal Democrats | J. Dawick | 839 | 39.5 | ±0.0 |
| Labour | D. Stubbing | 282 | 13.3 | –3.7 |
| Green | A. Thomas | 88 | 4.1 | –4.8 |
| Majority | | 74 | 3.5 | N/A |
| Turnout | | 2,122 | 43.4 | –12.0 |
| Registered electors | | 4,955 | | |
| Conservative gain from Liberal Democrats | | Swing | ▲5.6 | |

=== Pinhoe ===
Pinhoe
| Party | Candidate | Votes | % | ±% |
|---|---|---|---|---|
| Conservative | J. Landers | 1,151 | 49.4 | +11.3 |
| Labour | R. Northcott* | 1,078 | 46.2 | –2.1 |
| Liberal Democrats | A. Vokes | 102 | 4.4 | +0.4 |
| Majority | | 73 | 3.2 | N/A |
| Turnout | | 2,331 | 59.5 | –2.9 |
| Registered electors | | 3,980 | | |
| Conservative gain from Labour | | Swing | ▲6.7 | |

=== Polsloe ===
Polsloe
| Party | Candidate | Votes | % | ±% |
|---|---|---|---|---|
| Conservative | Y. Henson* | 888 | 47.1 | +20.8 |
| Labour | C. Duff | 612 | 32.4 | –17.1 |
| Liberal Democrats | P. Davies | 250 | 13.3 | +5.6 |
| Green | S. Dunstan | 106 | 5.6 | –7.7 |
| Liberal | Y. Wells | 30 | 1.6 | N/A |
| Majority | | 276 | 14.7 | N/A |
| Turnout | | 1,886 | 49.3 | –6.7 |
| Registered electors | | 3,887 | | |
| Conservative hold | | Swing | ▲19.0 | |

=== Rougemont ===
Rougemont
| Party | Candidate | Votes | % | ±% |
|---|---|---|---|---|
| Labour | B. Burt* | 937 | 52.6 | –4.5 |
| Conservative | M. Woolfenden | 484 | 27.2 | +7.5 |
| Liberal Democrats | P. Brock | 226 | 12.7 | +2.5 |
| Green | M. Dorman | 134 | 7.5 | –3.1 |
| Majority | | 453 | 25.4 | –12.0 |
| Turnout | | 1,781 | 41.0 | –10.3 |
| Registered electors | | 4,376 | | |
| Labour hold | | Swing | ▼6.0 | |

=== St. Davids ===
St. Davids
| Party | Candidate | Votes | % | ±% |
|---|---|---|---|---|
| Conservative | R. Yeo* | 882 | 37.2 | +1.8 |
| Labour | D. Parker | 808 | 34.0 | +6.0 |
| Liberal Democrats | C. Earle | 393 | 16.6 | +2.1 |
| Green | S. Potter | 187 | 7.9 | –11.3 |
| Independent | C. Early | 103 | 4.3 | N/A |
| Majority | | 74 | 3.2 | –4.2 |
| Turnout | | 2,373 | 40.1 | –14.2 |
| Registered electors | | 5,983 | | |
| Conservative hold | | Swing | ▼2.1 | |

=== St. Leonards ===
St. Leonards
| Party | Candidate | Votes | % | ±% |
|---|---|---|---|---|
| Liberal Democrats | V. Howell | 907 | 39.7 | +9.3 |
| Conservative | G. Owens* | 775 | 33.9 | +0.1 |
| Labour | J. Owen | 540 | 23.6 | –5.4 |
| Green | P. Edwards | 65 | 2.8 | –4.0 |
| Majority | | 132 | 5.8 | N/A |
| Turnout | | 2,287 | 51.6 | –7.1 |
| Registered electors | | 4,495 | | |
| Liberal Democrats gain from Conservative | | Swing | ▲4.6 | |
