= 1984 Exeter City Council election =

1984 English local election

| ← 1983 | 3 May 1984 | 1986 → |

12 out of 36 seats to Exeter City Council 19 seats needed for a majority

| | First party | Second party |
|---|---|---|
| Party | Conservative | Labour |
| Last election | 21 seats, 42.6% | 10 seats, 30.5% |
| Seats won | 5 | 4 |
| Seats after | 16 | 14 |
| Seat change | ▼5 | ▲4 |
| Popular vote | 11,226 | 7,015 |
| Percentage | 43.2% | 27.0% |
| Swing | ▲0.6% | ▼3.5% |
| | Third party | Fourth party |
| Party | Alliance | Independent |
| Last election | 4 seats, 23.7% | 1 seat, 2.0% |
| Seats won | 3 | 0 |
| Seats after | 5 | 1 |
| Seat change | ▲1 | Steady |
| Popular vote | 7,464 | 0 |
| Percentage | 28.7% | 0.0% |
| Swing | ▲5.0% | ▼2.0% |
Council control before election
Conservative
Council control after election
No overall control

The 1984 Exeter City Council election took place on 3 May 1984 to elect members of Exeter City Council in Devon, England. This was on the same day as other local elections.

== Summary ==
=== Election result ===
1984 Exeter City Council election
| Party | This election | | | Full council | | | This election | | |
| Party | Seats | Net | Seats % | Other | Total | Total % | Votes | Votes % | +/− |
|---|---|---|---|---|---|---|---|---|---|
| Conservative | 5 | ▼5 | 41.7 | 11 | 16 | 44.4 | 11,226 | 43.2 | +0.6 |
| Labour | 4 | ▲4 | 33.3 | 10 | 14 | 38.9 | 7,015 | 27.0 | –3.5 |
| Alliance | 3 | ▲1 | 25.0 | 2 | 5 | 13.9 | 7,464 | 28.7 | +5.0 |
| Independent | 0 | Steady | 0.0 | 1 | 1 | 2.8 | N/A | N/A | –2.0 |
| Ecology | 0 | Steady | 0.0 | 0 | 0 | 0.0 | 284 | 1.1 | –0.1 |

== Ward results ==
=== Alphington ===
Alphington
| Party | Candidate | Votes | % | ±% |
|---|---|---|---|---|
| Alliance | A. Fry | 1,485 | 52.2 | +8.8 |
| Conservative | P. Spencer* | 1,071 | 38.1 | –3.3 |
| Labour | A. Lester | 226 | 8.0 | –3.5 |
| Ecology | P. Drake | 47 | 1.7 | –1.8 |
| Majority | | 414 | 14.0 | N/A |
| Turnout | | 2,829 | 58.3 | –3.8 |
| Registered electors | | 4,821 | | |
| Alliance gain from Conservative | | Swing | ▲6.1 | |

=== Barton ===
Barton
| Party | Candidate | Votes | % | ±% |
|---|---|---|---|---|
| Labour | P. Edwards | 1,036 | 45.1 | +6.0 |
| Conservative | K. Callis* | 991 | 43.1 | +3.0 |
| Alliance | S. Pembroke | 271 | 11.8 | –9.0 |
| Majority | | 45 | 2.0 | N/A |
| Turnout | | 2,298 | 60.1 | +6.2 |
| Registered electors | | 3,826 | | |
| Labour gain from Conservative | | Swing | ▲1.5 | |

=== Countess Wear ===
Countess Wear
| Party | Candidate | Votes | % | ±% |
|---|---|---|---|---|
| Conservative | D. Bess* | 1,247 | 64.7 | +1.5 |
| Labour | M. Taylor | 423 | 22.0 | –4.9 |
| Alliance | M. Nation | 257 | 13.3 | +3.3 |
| Majority | | 824 | 42.8 | N/A |
| Turnout | | 1,927 | 50.3 | –11.7 |
| Registered electors | | 3,830 | | |
| Conservative hold | | Swing | ▲3.2 | |

=== Cowick ===
Cowick
| Party | Candidate | Votes | % | ±% |
|---|---|---|---|---|
| Labour | R. Slack | 1,103 | 48.0 | +9.4 |
| Conservative | R. Bellamy | 838 | 36.5 | –5.7 |
| Alliance | S. Hebron | 358 | 15.6 | –3.6 |
| Majority | | 265 | 11.5 | N/A |
| Turnout | | 2,299 | 53.1 | +2.1 |
| Registered electors | | 4,327 | | |
| Labour gain from Conservative | | Swing | ▲7.6 | |

=== Exwick ===
Exwick
| Party | Candidate | Votes | % | ±% |
|---|---|---|---|---|
| Labour | P. Blalyk | 940 | 38.8 | –3.4 |
| Conservative | H. Bower* | 879 | 36.3 | –0.6 |
| Alliance | P. Palmer | 550 | 22.7 | +1.8 |
| Ecology | R. Vail | 54 | 2.2 | N/A |
| Majority | | 61 | 2.5 | N/A |
| Turnout | | 2,423 | 52.7 | –1.2 |
| Registered electors | | 4,601 | | |
| Labour gain from Conservative | | Swing | ▼1.4 | |

=== Heavitree ===
Heavitree
| Party | Candidate | Votes | % | ±% |
|---|---|---|---|---|
| Alliance | A. Williamson* | 1,059 | 50.1 | +7.2 |
| Conservative | I. Richards | 738 | 34.9 | –6.1 |
| Labour | E. Culpeper | 316 | 15.0 | –1.1 |
| Majority | | 321 | 15.2 | N/A |
| Turnout | | 2,113 | 52.7 | –0.6 |
| Registered electors | | 4,013 | | |
| Alliance hold | | Swing | ▲6.7 | |

=== Pennsylvania ===
Pennsylvania
| Party | Candidate | Votes | % | ±% |
|---|---|---|---|---|
| Alliance | M. McNair | 1,144 | 49.6 | +9.9 |
| Conservative | E. Whiteway* | 941 | 40.8 | –8.8 |
| Labour | J. Marshall | 221 | 9.6 | –1.2 |
| Majority | | 203 | 8.8 | N/A |
| Turnout | | 2,306 | 51.7 | +0.4 |
| Registered electors | | 4,461 | | |
| Alliance gain from Conservative | | Swing | ▲9.4 | |

=== Pinhoe ===
Pinhoe
| Party | Candidate | Votes | % | ±% |
|---|---|---|---|---|
| Conservative | J. Pollitt* | 1,065 | 55.2 | +4.4 |
| Labour | R. Westlake | 618 | 32.0 | –0.3 |
| Alliance | C. Gale | 246 | 12.8 | –4.1 |
| Majority | | 447 | 23.2 | N/A |
| Turnout | | 1,929 | 47.1 | –7.2 |
| Registered electors | | 4,097 | | |
| Conservative hold | | Swing | ▲2.4 | |

=== Polsloe ===
Polsloe
| Party | Candidate | Votes | % | ±% |
|---|---|---|---|---|
| Conservative | Y. Henson | 827 | 48.0 | +0.3 |
| Labour | R. Smith | 647 | 37.6 | +2.6 |
| Alliance | T. Murray | 249 | 14.5 | –0.8 |
| Majority | | 180 | 10.4 | N/A |
| Turnout | | 1,723 | 45.1 | –1.7 |
| Registered electors | | 3,822 | | |
| Conservative hold | | Swing | ▼1.2 | |

=== Rougemont ===
Rougemont
| Party | Candidate | Votes | % | ±% |
|---|---|---|---|---|
| Labour | B. Burt | 816 | 36.3 | +2.3 |
| Conservative | D. Henson* | 744 | 33.1 | +2.0 |
| Alliance | A. Carless | 644 | 28.6 | –1.3 |
| Ecology | S. Littlejohn | 47 | 2.1 | –2.9 |
| Majority | | 72 | 3.2 | N/A |
| Turnout | | 2,251 | 53.0 | –2.4 |
| Registered electors | | 4,251 | | |
| Labour gain from Conservative | | Swing | ▲0.2 | |

=== St Davids ===
St Davids
| Party | Candidate | Votes | % | ±% |
|---|---|---|---|---|
| Conservative | R. Yeo* | 861 | 52.8 | +4.2 |
| Labour | A. Petrie | 412 | 25.2 | +7.8 |
| Alliance | T. Ludkin | 291 | 17.8 | +2.8 |
| Ecology | T. Brenan | 68 | 4.2 | –6.8 |
| Majority | | 449 | 25.5 | N/A |
| Turnout | | 1,632 | 29.5 | –13.7 |
| Registered electors | | 5,960 | | |
| Conservative hold | | Swing | ▼2.8 | |

=== St Leonards ===
St Leonards
| Party | Candidate | Votes | % | ±% |
|---|---|---|---|---|
| Conservative | G. Owens | 1,024 | 45.3 | –0.2 |
| Alliance | C. Cockrell | 910 | 40.3 | –3.0 |
| Labour | R. Snowden | 257 | 11.4 | +0.2 |
| Ecology | T. Brenan | 68 | 3.0 | N/A |
| Majority | | 114 | 5.0 | N/A |
| Turnout | | 2,259 | 52.2 | –4.1 |
| Registered electors | | 4,328 | | |
| Conservative gain from Alliance | | Swing | ▲1.4 | |
