= 1994 Exeter City Council election =

1994 English local election

← 1992	5 May 1994	1995 →

12 out of 36 seats to Exeter City Council 19 seats needed for a majority

	First party	Second party
Party	Labour	Conservative
Last election	16 seats, 31.9%	14 seats, 40.4%
Seats won	8	1
Seats after	16	12
Seat change	Steady	▼2
Popular vote	10,182	5,184
Percentage	40.9%	20.8%
Swing	▲9.0%	▼19.6%
	Third party	Fourth party
Party	Liberal Democrats	Liberal
Last election	5 seats, 22.1%	1 seat, 1.3%
Seats won	2	1
Seats after	6	2
Seat change	▲1	▲1
Popular vote	7,356	1,253
Percentage	29.6%	5.0%
Swing	▲7.5%	▲3.7%
Council control before election
No overall control
Council control after election
No overall control

The 1994 Exeter City Council election took place on 5 May 1994 to elect members of Exeter City Council in Devon, England. This was on the same day as other local elections.

== Summary ==
=== Election result ===
1994 Exeter City Council election
Party	This election			Full council			This election		
Party	Seats	Net	Seats %	Other	Total	Total %	Votes	Votes %	+/−
Labour	8	Steady	66.7	8	16	44.4	10,182	40.9	+9.0
Conservative	1	▼2	8.3	11	12	33.3	5,184	20.8	–19.6
Liberal Democrats	2	▲1	16.7	4	6	16.7	7,356	29.6	+7.5
Liberal	1	▲1	8.3	1	2	44.4	1,253	5.0	+3.7
Green	0	Steady	0.0	0	0	0.0	702	2.8	–0.3
Independent	0	Steady	0.0	0	0	0.0	115	0.5	–0.7
National Front	0	Steady	0.0	0	0	0.0	79	0.3	N/A

== Ward results ==
=== Pennsylvania ===
Pennsylvania
Party	Candidate	Votes	%	±%
Liberal Democrats	J. Holman*	1,371	58.2	+18.7
Conservative	K. Atkins	531	22.5	–20.5
Labour	M. Hilson	369	15.7	+2.4
Green	T. Brenan	84	3.6	–0.5
Majority		840	35.7	N/A
Turnout		2,355	49.2	+5.8
Registered electors		4,787		
Liberal Democrats hold		Swing	▲19.6	

=== Pinhoe ===
Pinhoe
Party	Candidate	Votes	%	±%
Labour	M. Mitchell*	1,219	52.7	+20.3
Conservative	C. Kirk	598	25.9	–21.2
Liberal Democrats	A. Vokes	454	19.6	+6.3
Green	B. Packer	42	1.8	–3.8
Majority		621	26.8	N/A
Turnout		2,313	57.4	+8.1
Registered electors		4,030		
Labour hold		Swing	▲20.8	

=== Polsloe ===
Polsloe
Party	Candidate	Votes	%	±%
Labour	P. Shepherd*	838	44.2	+11.8
Liberal Democrats	A. Taylor	534	28.2	+14.9
Conservative	E. Runciman	390	20.6	–26.5
Green	M. Totterdell	95	5.0	–0.6
National Front	G. Needs	38	2.0	N/A
Majority		304	16.0	N/A
Turnout		1,895	50.2	+0.9
Registered electors		3,775		
Labour hold		Swing	▼1.6	

=== Rougemont ===
Rougemont
Party	Candidate	Votes	%	±%
Labour	J. Lloyd*	1,114	57.8	+5.2
Liberal Democrats	T. Thompson	380	19.7	+7.0
Conservative	G. Williams	314	16.3	–10.9
Green	A. Thomas	118	6.1	–1.4
Majority		734	38.1	+12.7
Turnout		1,926	47.9	+6.9
Registered electors		4,021		
Labour hold		Swing	▼0.9	

=== St. Davids ===
St. Davids
Party	Candidate	Votes	%	±%
Labour	E. Balley	1,052	36.2	+2.2
Liberal Democrats	M. Jeffery	1,028	35.4	+18.8
Conservative	G. Gooding	682	23.5	–13.7
Green	P. Edwards	142	4.9	–3.0
Majority		24	0.8	N/A
Turnout		2,904	48.3	+8.2
Registered electors		6,012		
Labour gain from Conservative		Swing	▼10.5	

=== St. Leonards ===
St. Leonards
Party	Candidate	Votes	%	±%
Liberal Democrats	P. Brock	1,174	49.9	+10.2
Labour	L. Taylor	566	24.1	+0.5
Conservative	A. Goddard	496	21.1	–12.8
Independent	P. Vincent	115	4.9	N/A
Majority		608	25.9	+20.1
Turnout		2,351	53.6	+2.0
Registered electors		4,336		
Liberal Democrats gain from Conservative		Swing	▲4.9	

=== St. Loyes ===
St. Loyes
Party	Candidate	Votes	%	±%
Liberal	M. Danks	822	40.3	+1.1
Labour	E. Barnett*	650	31.9	+3.7
Conservative	H. Arden	357	17.5	–15.2
Liberal Democrats	J. Freeman	182	8.9	N/A
Green	T. Canning	29	1.4	N/A
Majority		172	8.4	+1.9
Turnout		2,040	53.3	–8.0
Registered electors		3,625		
Liberal gain from Labour		Swing	▼1.3	

=== St. Thomas ===
St. Thomas
Party	Candidate	Votes	%	±%
Labour	M. Rich*	938	46.5	+4.4
Liberal Democrats	J. Gover	543	26.9	+5.1
Conservative	G. Sclater	423	21.0	–10.8
Green	R. Gittins	72	3.6	–0.7
National Front	W. Ablett	41	2.0	N/A
Majority		395	19.6	+9.2
Turnout		2,017	48.2	–7.2
Registered electors		4,185		
Labour hold		Swing	▼0.4	

=== Stoke Hill ===
Stoke Hill
Party	Candidate	Votes	%	±%
Labour	P. Hill*	1,089	63.0	–1.5
Liberal Democrats	V. Palfrey	332	19.2	+7.2
Conservative	S. Burnham	244	14.1	–5.2
Green	M. Dorman	63	3.6	–0.6
Majority		757	43.8	+0.1
Turnout		1,728	41.6	–2.1
Registered electors		4,154		
Labour hold		Swing	▼4.4	

=== Topsham ===
Topsham
Party	Candidate	Votes	%	±%
Conservative	M. Evans	1,011	46.7	+9.5
Liberal Democrats	A. Williamson	767	35.5	+26.3
Labour	K. Owen	328	15.2	–5.7
Green	O. Michaelson	57	2.6	+0.5
Majority		244	11.3	+4.2
Turnout		2,163	63.5	+0.2
Registered electors		3,406		
Conservative hold		Swing	▼8.4	

=== Whipton ===
Whipton
Party	Candidate	Votes	%	±%
Labour	V. Long*	1,122	69.6	+9.5
Liberal Democrats	G. Philpotts	436	27.0	+16.2
Conservative	S. Dunstan	55	3.4	–22.4
Majority		686	42.5	+8.2
Turnout		1,613	45.1	–4.7
Registered electors		3,576		
Labour hold		Swing	▼3.4	

=== Wonford ===
Wonford
Party	Candidate	Votes	%	±%
Labour	G. Clark*	897	57.3	+5.6
Liberal	M. Davidson	431	27.5	N/A
Liberal Democrats	M. Horgan	155	9.9	–24.4
Conservative	J. Evans	83	5.3	–5.2
Majority		466	29.8	+12.3
Turnout		1,566	46.5	–0.9
Registered electors		3,374		
Labour hold				
