= 1996 Exeter City Council election =

1996 English local election

← 1995	2 May 1996	1998 →

13 out of 36 seats to Exeter City Council 19 seats needed for a majority

	First party	Second party
Party	Labour	Liberal Democrats
Last election	18 seats, 52.0%	6 seats, 21.2%
Seats won	9	2
Seats after	24	7
Seat change	▲6	▲1
Popular vote	11,713	5,423
Percentage	45.9%	21.2%
Swing	▼6.1%	0.0%
	Third party	Fourth party
Party	Liberal	Conservative
Last election	2 seats, 4.4%	10 seats, 17.9%
Seats won	1	0
Seats after	3	2
Seat change	▲1	▼8
Popular vote	1,717	6,036
Percentage	6.7%	23.6%
Swing	▲2.3%	▲5.7%
Council control before election
No overall control
Council control after election
Labour

The 1996 Exeter City Council election took place on 2 May 1996 to elect members of Exeter City Council in Devon, England. This was on the same day as other local elections.

== Summary ==
=== Overview ===
At the election, the Labour Party gained an overall majority on the council, while the Conservatives suffered their biggest loss of seats in a single election since the local government re-organisation in 1974, with a net loss of eight seats.

Despite improvements in the popular vote (where they came second) and in marginal wards, the Conservatives fell to a record low of two seats and ended up in fourth place, behind the Liberal Party.

Both the Liberal Democrats and Liberal Party made minor gains, each winning an extra seat and obtaining a higher or similar share of the popular vote than the 1995 election. The Liberal Democrats became the official opposition for the first time.

=== Election result ===
1996 Exeter City Council election
Party	This election			Full council			This election		
Party	Seats	Net	Seats %	Other	Total	Total %	Votes	Votes %	+/−
Labour	9	▲6	69.2	15	24	66.7	11,713	45.9	–6.1
Liberal Democrats	3	▲1	23.1	4	7	19.4	5,423	21.2	±0.0
Liberal	1	▲1	7.7	2	3	8.3	1,717	6.7	+2.3
Conservative	0	▼8	0.0	2	2	5.6	6,036	23.6	+5.7
Green	0	Steady	0.0	0	0	0.0	610	2.4	+0.5
Independent	0	Steady	0.0	0	0	0.0	31	0.1	N/A

== Ward results ==
=== Alphington ===
Alphington
Party	Candidate	Votes	%	±%
Liberal Democrats	P. Smith	1,156	48.6	–12.7
Labour	R. Mathers	702	29.5	+4.8
Conservative	M. Jordan	469	19.7	+8.3
Green	R. Gittens	54	2.3	+0.5
Majority		454	19.1	–17.5
Turnout		2,381	39.7	–7.7
Registered electors		6,033		
Liberal Democrats hold		Swing	▼8.8	

=== Barton ===
Barton (2 seats due to by-election)
Party	Candidate	Votes	%
Labour	B. McNamara*	1,032	54.6
Labour	C. McNamara	966	51.1
Liberal	H. Alford	495	26.2
Liberal	V. Iiolt	419	22.2
Conservative	A. Leadbetter	308	16.3
Conservative	D. Yeld	259	13.7
Liberal Democrats	G. Philpotts	89	4.7
Liberal Democrats	T. Revesz	57	3.0
Turnout		1,889	46.9
Registered electors		4,028	
Labour gain from Conservative			
Labour hold			

=== Countess Wear ===
Countess Wear
Party	Candidate	Votes	%	±%
Labour	G. Sheldon	886	50.0	+8.6
Conservative	A. Stilliard	561	31.7	–5.1
Liberal Democrats	S. Barrett	270	15.2	–2.2
Liberal	M. Berry	54	3.0	+0.5
Majority		325	18.4	+13.7
Turnout		1,771	50.2	–9.3
Registered electors		3,566		
Labour gain from Conservative		Swing	▲6.9	

=== Cowick ===
Cowick
Party	Candidate	Votes	%	±%
Labour	B. Robson	1,161	61.3	–5.3
Conservative	E. Knapp*	513	27.1	+6.1
Liberal Democrats	M. Pack	219	11.6	–0.8
Majority		648	34.2	–11.3
Turnout		1,893	44.3	–4.1
Registered electors		4,330		
Labour gain from Conservative		Swing	▼5.7	

=== Exwick ===
Exwick
Party	Candidate	Votes	%	±%
Labour	H. Slack	1,473	71.9	+5.4
Liberal Democrats	T. Thompson	270	13.2	–5.3
Conservative	T. Porter	264	12.9	+1.4
Green	B. Packer	43	2.1	–1.4
Majority		1,203	58.7	+10.7
Turnout		2,050	35.2	–6.0
Registered electors		5,915		
Labour hold		Swing	▲5.4	

=== Heavitree ===
Heavitree
Party	Candidate	Votes	%	±%
Liberal	D. Morrish	749	36.9	N/A
Labour	D. Perrin	568	28.0	–8.8
Liberal Democrats	A. Williamson	440	21.7	–20.0
Conservative	C. Hodgson	244	12.0	–6.1
Green	S. Pfeiffer	30	1.5	–1.9
Majority		181	8.9	N/A
Turnout		2,031	47.5	+1.9
Registered electors		4,304		
Liberal gain from Conservative				

=== Pennsylvania ===
Pennsylvania
Party	Candidate	Votes	%	±%
Liberal Democrats	D. Treharne	871	42.2	–16.0
Conservative	S. Syvret*	672	32.6	+10.1
Labour	C. Boyle	440	21.3	+5.6
Green	T. Brenan	80	3.9	+0.3
Majority		199	9.6	–26.1
Turnout		2,063	42.2	–7.0
Registered electors		4,937		
Liberal Democrats gain from Conservative		Swing	▼13.1	

=== Pinhoe ===
Pinhoe
Party	Candidate	Votes	%	±%
Labour	V. Dixon	1,126	53.1	+3.7
Conservative	J. Landers*	672	37.6	+7.8
Liberal Democrats	A. Vokes	174	8.2	–10.9
Green	S. Dunstan	23	1.1	–0.6
Majority		454	15.5	–11.3
Turnout		1,995	53.9	–3.5
Registered electors		3,967		
Labour gain from Conservative		Swing	▼2.1	

=== Polsloe ===
Polsloe
Party	Candidate	Votes	%	±%
Labour	M. Mills	709	43.0	–0.7
Conservative	Y. Henson*	648	39.3	+19.1
Liberal Democrats	A. Vokes	174	8.2	–17.5
Green	T. Canning	69	4.2	–0.8
Independent	K. Needs	31	1.9	N/A
Majority		61	3.7	–12.3
Turnout		1,631	39.7	–10.5
Registered electors		4,153		
Labour gain from Conservative		Swing	▼9.9	

=== Rougemont ===
Rougemont
Party	Candidate	Votes	%	±%
Labour	R. Slack*	1,124	64.3	+6.5
Conservative	G. Williams	336	19.2	+2.9
Liberal Democrats	J. Bahrij	176	10.1	–9.6
Green	A. Thomas	111	6.4	+0.3
Majority		788	45.1	+7.0
Turnout		1,747	35.6	–12.3
Registered electors		4,927		
Labour hold		Swing	▲1.8	

=== St. Davids ===
St. Davids
Party	Candidate	Votes	%	±%
Labour	M. Griffiths	939	40.1	+3.9
Liberal Democrats	A. Hoey	848	36.2	+0.8
Conservative	G. Gooding	442	18.9	–4.6
Green	P. Edwards	115	4.9	±0.0
Majority		91	3.9	+3.1
Turnout		2,344	36.9	–11.4
Registered electors		6,389		
Labour gain from Conservative		Swing	▲1.6	

=== St. Leonards ===
St. Leonards
Party	Candidate	Votes	%	±%
Liberal Democrats	P. Davies	679	34.0	–15.9
Conservative	N. Shiel*	648	32.4	+11.3
Labour	V. Vincent	587	29.4	+5.3
Green	K. Morris	85	4.3	N/A
Majority		31	1.6	–24.3
Turnout		1,999	42.9	–10.7
Registered electors		4,700		
Liberal Democrats hold		Swing	▼13.6	
