= 1998 Exeter City Council election =

1998 English local election

← 1996	7 May 1998	1999 →

12 out of 36 seats to Exeter City Council 19 seats needed for a majority

	First party	Second party
Party	Labour	Liberal Democrats
Last election	24 seats, 45.9%	7 seats, 20.3%
Seats won	6	3
Seats after	22	8
Seat change	▼2	▲1
Popular vote	7,123	3,529
Percentage	40.9%	20.3%
Swing	▼5.0%	▼0.9%
	Third party	Fourth party
Party	Conservative	Liberal
Last election	2 seats, 23.6%	3 seats, 6.7%
Seats won	2	1
Seats after	3	3
Seat change	▲1	Steady
Popular vote	5,077	1,251
Percentage	29.2%	7.2%
Swing	▲5.6%	▲0.5%
Council control before election
Labour
Council control after election
Labour

The 1998 Exeter City Council election took place on 7 May 1998 to elect members of Exeter City Council in Devon, England. This was on the same day as other local elections.

== Summary ==
=== Election result ===
1998 Exeter City Council election
Party	This election			Full council			This election		
Party	Seats	Net	Seats %	Other	Total	Total %	Votes	Votes %	+/−
Labour	6	▼2	50.0	16	22	61.1	7,123	40.9	–5.0
Liberal Democrats	3	▲1	25.0	5	8	22.2	3,529	20.3	–0.9
Conservative	2	▲1	16.7	1	3	8.3	5,077	29.2	+5.6
Liberal	1	Steady	8.3	2	3	8.3	1,251	7.2	+0.5
Green	0	Steady	0.0	0	0	0.0	430	2.5	+0.1

== Ward results ==
=== Pennsylvania ===
Pennsylvania
Party	Candidate	Votes	%	±%
Liberal Democrats	J. Holman*	625	44.5	+2.3
Conservative	K. Atkins	359	25.6	–7.0
Labour	C. Duff	317	22.6	+1.3
Green	T. Brenan	102	7.3	+3.4
Majority		266	19.0	+9.4
Turnout		1,403	29.3	–12.9
Registered electors		4,897		
Liberal Democrats hold		Swing	▲4.7	

=== Pinhoe ===
Pinhoe
Party	Candidate	Votes	%	±%
Labour	K. Moore	919	56.0	+2.9
Conservative	I. St. Claire Williams	585	35.7	–1.9
Liberal Democrats	S. Wilcox	136	8.3	+0.1
Majority		334	20.4	+4.9
Turnout		1,640	41.4	–12.5
Registered electors		4,010		
Labour hold		Swing	▲2.4	

=== Polsloe ===
Polsloe
Party	Candidate	Votes	%	±%
Conservative	Y. Henson	587	46.7	+7.4
Labour	P. Shepherd*	550	43.7	+0.7
Liberal Democrats	C. Miller	92	7.3	–0.9
Liberal	F. Potter	29	2.3	N/A
Majority		37	2.9	N/A
Turnout		1,258	31.9	–7.8
Registered electors		4,014		
Conservative gain from Labour		Swing	▲3.4	

=== Rougemont ===
Rougemont
Party	Candidate	Votes	%	±%
Labour	A. Duncan	725	56.3	–8.0
Conservative	G. Williams	263	19.7	+1.2
Liberal Democrats	S. Brock	172	12.9	+3.3
Green	A. Thomas	127	9.5	+3.5
Majority		462	38.1	–7.0
Turnout		1,287	28.9	–6.7
Registered electors		4,707		
Labour hold		Swing	▼4.6	

=== St. Davids ===
St. Davids
Party	Candidate	Votes	%	±%
Liberal Democrats	G. Oakes	725	39.8	+3.6
Labour	P. Ferris	692	38.0	–2.1
Conservative	J. Perry	298	16.4	–2.5
Green	P. Edwards	105	5.8	+0.9
Majority		33	1.8	N/A
Turnout		1,820	27.1	–9.8
Registered electors		6,768		
Liberal Democrats gain from Labour		Swing	▲2.9	

=== St. Leonards ===
St. Leonards
Party	Candidate	Votes	%	±%
Liberal Democrats	P. Brock*	792	38.8	+4.8
Conservative	N. Shiel	776	38.0	+5.6
Labour	R. Stevens	408	20.0	–9.4
Green	P. Merry	64	3.1	N/A
Majority		26	0.8	–0.8
Turnout		2,040	44.7	+1.8
Registered electors		4,715		
Liberal Democrats hold		Swing	▼0.4	

=== St. Loyes ===
St. Loyes
Party	Candidate	Votes	%	±%
Liberal	M. Danks*	740	55.9	+7.2
Labour	B. Denning	376	28.4	–7.5
Conservative	G. Williams	208	15.7	+4.0
Majority		364	27.5	+14.7
Turnout		1,324	32.9	–16.7
Registered electors		4,078		
Liberal hold		Swing	▲7.4	

=== St. Thomas ===
St. Thomas
Party	Candidate	Votes	%	±%
Labour	C. Boyle	758	50.5	–17.2
Liberal Democrats	A. Fullam	498	33.2	+20.1
Conservative	R. Edwardson	246	16.4	+1.3
Majority		260	17.3	–35.3
Turnout		1,502	35.9	–12.8
Registered electors		4,232		
Labour hold		Swing	▼18.7	

=== Stoke Hill ===
Stoke Hill
Party	Candidate	Votes	%	±%
Labour	P. Hill*	725	71.9	–5.2
Conservative	G. Sclater	154	15.3	+6.7
Liberal Democrats	M. Carrolle	98	9.7	–2.8
Green	S. Dunstan	32	3.2	+1.4
Majority		571	56.6	–8.0
Turnout		1,009	23.5	–15.0
Registered electors		4,346		
Labour hold		Swing	▼6.0	

=== Topsham ===
Topsham
Party	Candidate	Votes	%	±%
Conservative	M. Evans*	1,326	72.3	+35.2
Liberal Democrats	J. Bryant	282	15.4	–15.3
Labour	S. Barker	225	12.3	–17.3
Majority		1,044	57.0	+50.6
Turnout		1,833	48.7	–10.6
Registered electors		3,809		
Conservative hold		Swing	▲25.3	

=== Whipton ===
Whipton
Party	Candidate	Votes	%	±%
Labour	V. Long*	751	67.5	–8.7
Conservative	G. Hedley	191	17.2	+4.4
Liberal	G. Hookway	93	8.4	N/A
Liberal Democrats	K. Hillier	77	6.9	–2.2
Majority		560	50.4	–13.1
Turnout		1,112	30.1	–12.7
Registered electors		3,747		
Labour hold		Swing	▼6.6	

=== Wonford ===
Wonford
Party	Candidate	Votes	%	±%
Labour	O. Foggin	677	57.3	+1.2
Liberal	J. Spicer	389	32.9	–7.0
Conservative	A. Rogers	84	7.1	N/A
Liberal Democrats	A. Soper	32	2.7	+0.4
Majority		288	24.4	+8.1
Turnout		1,182	34.6	–10.8
Registered electors		3,483		
Labour hold		Swing	▲4.1	
