= 1999 Exeter City Council election =

1999 English local election

← 1998	6 May 1999	2000 →

12 out of 36 seats to Exeter City Council 19 seats needed for a majority

	First party	Second party
Party	Labour	Liberal Democrats
Last election	22 seats, 40.9%	7 seats, 20.3%
Seats won	8	2
Seats after	22	7
Seat change	Steady	Steady
Popular vote	8,146	3,881
Percentage	44.3%	21.1%
Swing	▲3.4%	▲0.8%
	Third party	Fourth party
Party	Conservative	Liberal
Last election	3 seats, 29.2%	3 seats, 7.2%
Seats won	1	1
Seats after	3	3
Seat change	Steady	Steady
Popular vote	3,916	2,201
Percentage	21.3%	12.0%
Swing	▼7.9%	▲4.8%
Council control before election
Labour
Council control after election
Labour

The 1999 Exeter City Council election took place on 6 May 1999 to elect members of Exeter City Council in Devon, England. This was on the same day as other local elections.

== Summary ==
=== Election result ===
1999 Exeter City Council election
Party	This election			Full council			This election		
Party	Seats	Net	Seats %	Other	Total	Total %	Votes	Votes %	+/−
Labour	8	Steady	66.7	14	22	61.1	8,146	44.3	+3.4
Liberal Democrats	2	Steady	16.7	5	7	22.2	3,881	21.1	+0.8
Conservative	1	Steady	8.3	2	3	8.3	3,916	21.3	–7.9
Liberal	1	Steady	8.3	2	3	8.3	2,201	12.0	+4.8
Green	0	Steady	0.0	0	0	0.0	255	1.4	–1.1

== Ward results ==
=== Alphington ===
Alphington
Party	Candidate	Votes	%	±%
Liberal Democrats	M. Browning*	1,360	58.8	+10.2
Labour	M. Walker	612	26.5	–3.0
Conservative	M. Jordan	340	14.7	–5.0
Majority		748	32.4	+13.3
Turnout		2,312	36.2	–3.5
Registered electors		6,465		
Liberal Democrats hold		Swing	▲6.6	

=== Barton ===
Barton
Party	Candidate	Votes	%	±%
Labour	C. McNamara*	797	52.3	–1.3
Liberal	G. Hookway	418	27.4	+1.7
Conservative	C. Wilkins	196	12.9	–3.1
Liberal Democrats	C. Millar	74	4.9	+0.3
Green	T. Brenan	38	2.5	N/A
Majority		379	24.9	N/A
Turnout		1,523	38.7	
Registered electors		3,989		
Labour hold		Swing	▼1.5	

=== Countess Wear ===
Countess Wear
Party	Candidate	Votes	%	±%
Labour	M. Baldwin*	879	56.2	+6.2
Conservative	J. Coates	551	35.3	+3.6
Liberal Democrats	M. Carrolle	133	8.5	–6.7
Majority		328	21.0	+2.6
Turnout		1,563	44.2	–6.0
Registered electors		3,593		
Labour hold		Swing	▲1.3	

=== Cowick ===
Cowick
Party	Candidate	Votes	%	±%
Labour	A. Dean*	876	56.5	–4.8
Conservative	R. Edwardson	469	30.3	+3.2
Liberal Democrats	S. Wilcox	205	13.2	+1.6
Majority		407	26.3	–7.9
Turnout		1,550	36.6	–7.7
Registered electors		4,281		
Labour hold		Swing	▼4.0	

=== Exwick ===
Exwick
Party	Candidate	Votes	%	±%
Labour	H. Catton	886	62.2	–9.7
Conservative	J. Perry	257	18.0	+5.1
Liberal Democrats	H. Goddard	227	15.9	+2.7
Green	P. Merry	55	3.9	+1.8
Majority		629	44.1	–14.6
Turnout		1,425	22.9	–12.3
Registered electors		6,314		
Labour hold		Swing	▼7.4	

=== Heavitree ===
Heavitree
Party	Candidate	Votes	%	±%
Liberal Democrats	S. Hobden	640	33.0	+11.3
Labour	R. Branston	540	27.8	–0.2
Liberal	S. Hodges	433	22.3	–14.6
Conservative	L. Clark	266	13.7	+1.7
Green	J. Hayward	62	3.2	+1.7
Majority		100	5.2	N/A
Turnout		1,941	45.7	–1.8
Registered electors		4,289		
Liberal Democrats hold		Swing	▲5.8	

=== St. Loyes ===
St. Loyes
Party	Candidate	Votes	%	±%
Liberal	J. Morrish*	1,001	72.8	+16.9
Labour	B. Denning	208	15.1	–13.3
Conservative	G. Hedley	166	12.1	–3.6
Majority		793	57.7	+30.2
Turnout		1,375	34.0	+1.1
Registered electors		4,086		
Liberal hold		Swing	▲15.1	

=== St. Thomas ===
St. Thomas
Party	Candidate	Votes	%	±%
Labour	R. Hill*	1,005	54.9	+4.4
Liberal Democrats	A. Fullam	582	31.8	–1.4
Conservative	G. Sclater	205	11.2	–5.2
Green	K. Morris	39	2.1	N/A
Majority		423	23.1	+5.8
Turnout		1,831	42.0	+6.1
Registered electors		4,401		
Labour hold		Swing	▲2.9	

=== Stoke Hill ===
Stoke Hill
Party	Candidate	Votes	%	±%
Labour	P. Oliver*	697	66.3	–5.6
Conservative	G. Williams	234	22.2	+6.9
Liberal Democrats	S. Barrett	121	11.5	+1.8
Majority		463	44.0	–12.6
Turnout		1,052	24.1	+0.6
Registered electors		4,417		
Labour hold		Swing	▼6.3	

=== Topsham ===
Topsham
Party	Candidate	Votes	%	±%
Conservative	D. Carr*	921	54.9	–17.4
Liberal Democrats	J. Bryant	428	25.5	+10.1
Labour	D. Baldwin	279	16.6	+4.3
Green	P. Edwards	50	3.0	N/A
Majority		493	29.4	–27.6
Turnout		1,678	41.6	–7.1
Registered electors		4,076		
Conservative hold		Swing	▼13.8	

=== Whipton ===
Whipton
Party	Candidate	Votes	%	±%
Labour	P. Edwards*	687	65.6	–1.9
Conservative	I. Williams	250	23.9	+6.7
Liberal Democrats	K. Hillier	111	10.6	+3.7
Majority		437	41.7	–8.7
Turnout		1,048	27.1	–3.0
Registered electors		3,895		
Labour hold		Swing	▼4.3	

=== Wonford ===
Wonford
Party	Candidate	Votes	%	±%
Labour	M. Midgely*	680	61.8	+4.5
Liberal	J. Spicer	349	31.7	–1.2
Conservative	S. Bunting	61	5.5	–1.6
Green	S. Glover	11	1.0	N/A
Majority		331	30.1	+5.7
Turnout		1,101	32.3	–2.3
Registered electors		3,455		
Labour hold		Swing	▲2.9	
